This is a list of Acts of the Parliament of England for the years 1485–1601 (i.e. during the reign of the House of Tudor).

For Acts passed during the period 1707–1800 see List of Acts of the Parliament of Great Britain.  See also the List of Acts of the Parliament of Scotland, the List of Acts of the Parliament of Ireland to 1700, and the List of Acts of the Parliament of Ireland, 1701–1800.

For Acts passed from 1801 onwards see List of Acts of the Parliament of the United Kingdom.  For Acts of the devolved parliaments and assemblies in the United Kingdom, see the List of Acts of the Scottish Parliament, the List of Acts of the Northern Ireland Assembly, and the List of Acts and Measures of the National Assembly for Wales; see also the List of Acts of the Parliament of Northern Ireland.

For medieval statutes, etc. that are not considered to be Acts of Parliament, see the List of English statutes.

The number shown after each act's title is its chapter number.  Acts are cited using this number, preceded by the year(s) of the reign during which the relevant parliamentary session was held; thus the Union with Ireland Act 1800 is cited as "39 & 40 Geo. 3 c. 67", meaning the 67th act passed during the session that started in the 39th year of the reign of George III and which finished in the 40th year of that reign. The modern convention is to use Arabic numerals in citations (thus "41 Geo. 3" rather than "41 Geo. III"). Acts of the last session of the Parliament of Great Britain and the first session of the Parliament of the United Kingdom are both cited as "41 Geo. 3".

Acts passed by the Parliament of England did not have a short title; however, some of these Acts have subsequently been given a short title by Acts of the Parliament of the United Kingdom (such as the Short Titles Act 1896).

Acts passed by the Parliament of England were deemed to have come into effect on the first day of the session in which they were passed.  Because of this, the years given in the list below may in fact be the year before a particular Act was passed.

Henry VII (1485–1509)

1485 (1 Hen. 7)

 (Title of the King) part preceding c. 1
 (Real actions) c.
 (Denizens) c. 2
 (Protections) c. 3
 (Clergy) c. 4
 (Tanners) c. 5
 (Pardon) c. 6
 (Hunting in forests) c. 7
 (Importation) c. 8
 (Importation) c. 9
 (Aliens) c. 10
 (Land with estate signed to christopher cameron ll

1487 (3 Hen. 7)

Note that the "Chronological Table of the Statutes" does not list a c. 15 for this statute

 (Star Chamber, etc.) c. 1
 (Recognizances) [c. 2]
 (Abduction of women) c. 2 — see Jane Statham
 (Taking of bail by justices) c. 3
 (Fraudulent deeds of gift) c. 4
 (Usury) c. 5
 (Usury) c. 6
 (Customs) c. 7
 (Alien merchants) c. 8
 (Citizens of London) c. 9
 (Costs in error) c. 10
 (Exportation) c. 11
 (King's officers and tenants) c. 12
 (Price of long bows) c. 13
 (King's household) c. 14
 (Feoffees in trust) c. 16 — see feoffee

1488 (4 Hen. 7)

 (Commissions of sewers) c. 1
 (Gold and silver) c. 2
 (Slaughter of beasts) c. 3
 (Protections) c. 4
 (Dismes) c. 5 — see tithe
 (Forest of Inglewood) c. 6 — see Inglewood Forest
 (Yeomen and grooms of the chamber) c. 7
 (Woollen cloth) c. 8
 (Hats and caps) c. 9
 (Importations, etc.) c. 10
 (Buying of wool) c. 11
 (Justice of the Peace) c. 12
 (Benefit of clergy) c. 13
 (Crown lands) c. 14
 (River Thames (netting fish on flood waters; that the Mayor of London shall have rule of the Ryver of Thames from Stanes to Yenlade)) c. 15 (repealed by 1977 Statute Law Repeals Act, Sch I Part XI)
 (Isle of Wight) c. 16 — see Isle of Wight
 (Wardship) c. 17
 (Treason) c. 18
 (Tillage) c. 19
 Collusive Actions Act 1488 c. 20
 (Orford Haven, Suffolk (illegal fishing nets)) c. 21 — see Orford, Suffolk
 (Gold) c. 22
 (Exportation) c. 23
 (Fines) c. 24

1489 (4 Hen. 7) (Rot. Parl. vol. vi p. 431)

 (Inhabitants of the town of Northampton)

1489 (4 Hen. 7) (Rot. Parl. vol. vi p. 434)

 (Convent of the monastery of Saint Andrew in Northampton)

1491 (7 Hen. 7)

Note that c. 2 was traditionally cited as two separate Acts (cc. 2, 3), cc. 3–7 were cited as cc. 4–8 respectively, cc. 8–23 were cited as Private Acts cc. 1–16, and c. 24 was not printed

 (Soldiers) c. 1
 (Service in the King's wars) c. 2
 (Weights and measures) c. 3
 (Challenge of riens deyns le gard in London abolished) c. 4
 (Abbots, priors, etc.) c. 5
 (Scots) c. 6
 (Customs) c. 7
 (Grants of offices to Thos. Crofte made void) c. 8
 (Fish) c. 9
 (Outlawry in Lancashire) c. 10 — see outlawry
 (Taxation) c. 11
 (Feoffments made by the King) c. 12
 (Letters patent to the Queen) c. 13
 (Barking Abbey payments to Havering Manor) c. 14 — see Barking Abbey and Havering Manor
 (Countess of Richmond and Derby) c. 15 — see Margaret Beaufort, Countess of Richmond and Derby
 (Restitution of Earl of Surrey) c. 16 — see Thomas Howard, 2nd Duke of Norfolk
 (Viscount Wells and wife) c. 17 — see John Welles, 1st Viscount Welles
 (Lord de la Warre) c. 18 — see Thomas West, 8th Baron De La Warr
 (Priory of Christchurch) c. 19 — see Christchurch Priory
 (Sir Thomas Lovell) c. 20 — see Thomas Lovell
 (Hugh Johnson and wife) c. 21
 (Attainder of John Hayes) c. 22
 (Attainder of Robt. Chamberlaine and Ric. White) c. 23
 (Outlawry in Lancashire) c. 24

1495 (11 Hen. 7)

 Treason Act 1495 c. 1 — this Act is still in force
 Vagabonds and Beggars Act c. 2
 (Offences against statutes) c. 3
 (Weights and measures) c. 4
 (Weirs) c. 5
 (Customs) c. 6
 (Riots) c. 7
 (Usury) c. 8
 (Tyndal, Lordship of) c. 9
 (Taxation) c. 10
 (Worsted) c. 11
 (Suing in forma pauperis) c. 12 Trial Lawyers Association of British Columbia c. Colombie-Britannique (Procureur général), 2014 CSC 59 au paragraphe 48.
 (Exportation) c. 13
 (Customs) c. 14
 (Sheriff's county court) c. 15
 (Calais) c. 16 — see Pale of Calais
 (Games, etc.) c. 17
 (Attendance in war) c. 18
 (Upholsterers) c. 19
 (Dowress, etc.) c. 20
 (Perjury) c. 21
 (Wages of labourers, etc.) c. 22
 (Fish) c. 23
 (Attaints) c. 24
 (Perjury) c. 25
 (Jurors) c. 26
 (Fustians) c. 27
 (Lands of Richard III assured by the King) c. 28
 (Resumption of Crown lands) c. 29
 (Gervys Home (remittal of attainder)) c. 30
 (Woodstock Manor grants void) c. 31 — see Woodstock, Oxfordshire
 (Queen's jointure) c. 32
 (Leases in Wales, Cornwall, and Chester void) c. 33
 (Lands assured to Prince of Wales) c. 34 — see Arthur, Prince of Wales
 (Lands assured to Duke of York) c. 35 — see Henry VIII of England
 (Estates of Duchess of Bedford) c. 36 — see Catherine Woodville, Duchess of Buckingham
 (Estates of Marquis of Dorset and wife) c. 37 — see Thomas Grey, 1st Marquess of Dorset
 (Countess of Oxford) c. 38 — see John de Vere, 13th Earl of Oxford
 (Estates of Earl of Suffolk) c. 39 — see John de la Pole, 2nd Duke of Suffolk
 (Estates of Earl of Surrey) c. 40 — see Thomas Howard, 2nd Duke of Norfolk
 (Annuity to Earl of Surrey) c. 41
 (Feoffment by Earl of Surrey) c. 42
 (Earl of Devon) c. 43 — see Edward Courtenay, 1st Earl of Devon (1485 creation)
 (Restitution of Earl of Kildare) c. 44 — sew Gerald FitzGerald, 8th Earl of Kildare
 (Prior of Kilmaynan, Ireland) c. 45
 (Custody of Viscount Beaumont and his estates) c. 46
 (Edward, Lord Dudley) c. 47
 (John, Lord Zouche and Seymour) c. 48
 (Sir R. Guldeford's lands in Kent disgavelled) c. 49
 (Sir Wm. Berkly (restitution)) c. 50
 (John Shaa (lost deeds)) c. 51
 (Dean of St Paul's (restitution)) c. 52
 (Thos. Middleton (restitution)) c. 53
 (Geo. Catesby (restitution)) c. 54
 (Simon Digby (grants confirmed)) c. 55
 (Sir Ric. Ratcliff (attainder annulled)) c. 56
 (Restitution of Clement Skelton) c. 57
 (Heirs of Wm. Waynsford (attainder annulled)) c. 58
 (Pardon of John Slingesby the elder) c. 59
 (Inheritance of Hugh Mayne) c. 60
 (Safety of Berwick and Carlisle) c. 61 — this Act is still in force
 (Expenses of King's household) c. 62
 (Attainder of Viscount Lovell) c. 63
 (Attainder of Sir William Stanley, etc.) c. 64
 (Peace of Estaples) c. 65

1496 (12 Hen. 7)

Note that cc. 8–13 were traditionally cited as Private Acts cc. 1–8 

 (Worsted, Norfolk) c. 1
 (Continuance of Acts of 11 Hen. 7) c. 2
 (Wages of labourers, etc.) c. 3
 (Woollen cloths) c. 4
 (Weights and measures) c. 5
 (Merchant adventurers) c. 6
 (Benefit of clergy) c. 7
 (Feoffments made by the King) c. 8
 (The Queen's dower) c. 9
 (Annuity of Earl of Surrey) c. 10
 (Restitution of Guy Sapcott) c. 11
 (Taxation) c. 12
 (Taxation) c. 13

1503 (19 Hen. 7)

 (Attendance in war) c. 1
 (Customs) c. 2
 (Attaints) c. 3
 (Cross-bows) c. 4
 (Coin) c. 5
 (Pewterers) c. 6
 Ordinances of Corporations Act 1503 c. 7
 (Scavage) c. 8
 (Process) c. 9
 (Gaols) c. 10
 (Deer, etc.) c. 11
 (Vagabonds) c. 12
 (Riots) c. 13
 (Retainers) c. 14
 (Feoffments to uses) c. 15
 (Jurors) c. 16
 (Worsted shearers) c. 17
 (Trade, Severn) c. 18
 (Curriers, etc.) c. 19
 (Costs in error) c. 20
 (Silk works) c. 21
 (Calais) c. 22
 (Hanse merchants) c. 23
 (Sheriff's county court) c. 24
 (Duchy of Lancaster) c. 25 — this Act is still in force
 (Prince of Wales) c. 26
 (Staple at Calais) c. 27
 (Power of the King to reverse attainders) c. 28
 (Monastery of Syon) c. 29
 (Partition of lands: Barkley and Earl of Surrey) c. 30
 (Actions) c. 31
 (Taxation) c. 32
 (Estates of Lord Wells) c. 33
 (Attainder of Lord Audley and others) c. 34
 (Restitution of Robert Brewce) c. 35
 (Recovery of Damages by Sir Wm. Mearin) c. 36
 (Restitution of John Heron) c. 37
 (Restitution of Richard Berkley) c. 38
 (Restitution of William Barley) c. 39
 (Restitution of John Harrington) c. 40

Henry VIII (1509–1547)

1509 (1 Hen. 8)

Note that cc. 16–20 were traditionally cited as Private Acts cc. 1–5

 (Repeal of 8 Hen. 6 c. 2) c. 1.
 (Woollen cloth) c. 2. An Act concerning the making of Woollen Cloth.
 (Receivers general) c. 3. An Act concerning Receivers.
 (Penal statutes) c. 4. An Act that Informations upon Penal Statutes mall be made within Three Years.
 (Customs) c. 5. An Act for the true Payment of the King's Customs.
 (Repeal of 11 Hen. 7 c. 3) c. 6. An Act for repealing of a Statute concerning Justices of Peace.
 (Coroners) c. 7. An Act concerning Coroners.
 (Escheators) c. 8. An Act against Escheators and Commissioners, for making false Returns of Offices and Commissions.
 (Staines bridge tolls) c. 9. An Act for the taking of Toll at Staynes Bridge, for the repairing thereof.
 (Letting of lands seized by the Crown) c. 10. An Act that no Lease shall be made of Lands seised into the King's Hands but in certain Cases.
 (Perjury) c. 11. An Act against Perjury.
 (Traverse of certain inquisitions) c. 12. An Act for Admittance of a Traverse against an untrue Inquisition.
 (Exportation) c. 13. An Act against carrying out of this Realm any Coin, Plate or Jewels.
 (Apparel) c. 14. An Act against wearing of costly Apparel.
 (Lands of Empson and Dudley) c. 15. An Act concerning Lands made in Trust to Empson and Dudley.
 (Expenses of King's household) c. 16
 (Expenses of King's wardrobe) c. 17
 (Dower of Queen Katherine (letters patent confirmed)) c. 18
 (Restitution of Robert Ratcliffe) c. 19
 (Taxation) c. 20

1511 (3 Hen. 8)

Note that cc. 16–23 were traditionally cited as Private Acts cc. 1–8

 (Exportation) c. 1. An Act against carrying out of this Realm Coin, Plate, &c.
 (Escheators) c. 2. An Act concerning Escheators and Commissioners.
 (Archery) c. 3. An Act concerning shooting in Long Bows.
 (Service in war beyond sea) c. 4. An Act of Privilege for such Persons as are in the King's Wars.
 (Soldiers) c. 5. An Act against such Captains as abridge their Soldiers of their Pay.
 (Woollen cloth) c. 6. An Act against deceitful making of Woollen Cloth.
 (Exportation) c. 7. An Act against carrying Cloths over Sea unshorn.
 (Assize of victuals) c. 8. An Act concerning the assizing and setting of Prices of Victuals.
 (Visors) c. 9. An Act against disguised Persons and wearing of Visours.
 (Leather) c. 10. An Act against buying of Leather out of the open Market, being not well tanned, or unsealed.
 (Physicians and surgeons) c. 11. An Act concerning Physicians and Surgeons.
 (Juries) c. 12. An Act against Sheriffs for Abuses.
 (Cross-bows) c. 13. An Act against shooting in Cross-bows.
 (Oils) c. 14. An Act for the searching of Oils within the City of London.
 (Hats and caps) c. 15. An Act concerning Hats and Caps.
 (Estates of Earl of Surrey) c. 16
 (Restitution of Lord Audley and others) c. 17
 (Grant to William Compton) c. 18
 (Restitution of John Dudley) c. 19
 (Restitution of Thomas Herte) c. 20
 (Restitution of Elizabeth Martyn) c. 21
 (Taxation) c. 22
 (Surveyors of Crown lands, etc.) c. 23

1512 (4 Hen. 8)

Note that cc. 9–17, 19, and 20 were traditionally cited as Private Acts cc. 1–9, 10, and 11 respectively, and that c. 18 was not traditionally included in printed collections of Acts

 (Bulwarks on the coast) c. 1. An Act concerning the making of Bulwarks by the Sea
 (Murders and felonies) c. 2. For Murder and Felony.
 (Juries in London) c. 3. The Act concerning Juries in London.
 (Outlawry) c. 4. For Proclamations to be made before Exigents be awarded.
 (Wages of labourers, etc.) c. 5. The Act repealing Penalties for giving of Wages to Labourers and Artificers.
 (Sealing of cloths) c. 6. The Act for sealing of Cloths of Gold and Silk.
 (Pewterers) c. 7. The Act made for Pewterers, and true Weights and Beams.
 Privilege of Parliament Act 1512 c. 8 (still in force). The Act concerning Richard Strode, for Matters reasoned in the Parliament.
 (Restitution of Earl of Devon) c. 9
 (Grant to Earl and Countess of Devon) c. 10
 (Countess of Devon and Hugh Conway) c. 11
 (Countess of Devon and William Knyvet) c. 12
 (Estates of Earl of Surrey) c. 13
 (Restitution of John and Thomas Wyndham) c. 14
 (Restitution of Thomas Empson) c. 15
 (Restitution of William Baskerville) c. 16
 (Expenses of King's wardrobe) c. 17
 (Surveyors of Crown lands, etc.) c. 18
 (Taxation) c. 19
 (Protection for John Skelton sheriff of Cumberland) c. 20

1513 (5 Hen. 8)

Note that cc. 9–19 were traditionally cited as Private Acts cc. 1–11

 (Debts to merchants of Tournai, etc. in France) c. 1 . An Act concerning Ministration of Justice in the City of Turneye.
 (Cloths) c. 2. An Act concerning White Cloths in Devonshire.
 (Exportation) c. 3. An Act that White Cloths under Five Marks may be carried over the Sea unshorn.
 (Worsteds) c. 4. An Act for avoiding Deceits in Worsteds.
 (Juries in London) c. 5. An Act concerning Juries in London.
 (Surgeons) c. 6. An Act that Surgeons be discharged of Constableship and other Things.
 (Leather) c. 7. An Act that Strangers buy no Leather but in open Market.
 (Pardon) c. 8. An Act concerning the Grant of the King's general Pardon,
 (Creation of Duke of Norfolk) c. 9
 (Creation of Duke of Suffolk) c. 10
 (Creation of Earl of Surrey) c. 11
 (Restitution of the Countess of Salisbury (Margaret Pole)) c. 12
 (Restitution of Humphrey Stafford) c. 13
 (Dowry of Countess of Oxford) c. 14
 (Restitution of John Audley) c. 15
 (Offices of packing woollen cloth, etc. in London) c. 16 — note that this Act is still in force
 (Taxation) c. 17
 (Sir Edward Poynings) c. 18
 (John Heron's appointment as Surveyor of Customs) c. 19

1514 (6 Hen. 8)

Note that cc. 19–25 were traditionally cited as Private Acts cc. 1–7 and that c. 26 was not included in traditional collections of Acts

 (Act of Apparel) c. 1. Act of Apparel.
 (Archery) c. 2. Act for Maintenance of Archery.
 (Artificers and labourers) c. 3. Act concerning Artificers and Labourers.
 (Proclamation before exigent, etc.) c. 4. Act for Proclamations to be made before the Exigent be awarded into foreign Shires.
 (Tillage) c. 5. Act concerning pulling down of Towns.
 (Felons and murderers) c. 6. Act concerning Felons and Murderers.
 (Thames watermen) c. 7. Act concerning Watermen on the Thames.
 (Cloths) c. 8. Act concerning Cloths called White Straits.
 (Cloths) c. 9. Act avoiding Deceits in making of Woollen Cloths.
 (Commissions of sewers) c. 10. Act concerning Commissions of Sewers.
 (Importation) c. 11. Act concerning the bringing in of Bow-staves into this Realm.
 (Exportation) c. 12. Act that Norfolk Wools be not carried out of this Realm.
 (Cross-bows, etc.) c. 13. Act avoiding shooting in Cross Bows.
 (Taxation) c. 14. Act concerning the King's Subsidy for Tonnage and Poundage.
 (Crown grants) c. 15. Act avoiding Second Letters Patents granted by the King.
 (Attendance in Parliament) c. 16 (repealed 1993 (c.50)). Act concerning Burgesses of the Parliament.
 (Deepening river at Canterbury) c. 17. Act concerning the River in Canterbury.
 (Bristol) c. 18. Act concerning Under-Sheriffs in Bristol.
 (Grant to Duke of Norfolk) c. 19
 (Letters Patent to Duke of Suffolk) c. 20
 (Restitution of Edward Belnap Knight) c. 21
 (Restitution of John White Clerk) c. 22
 (Assurance of Manor of Hanworth) c. 23
 (Surveyors of Crown lands, etc.) c. 24
 (Resumption of offices, annuities, etc.) c. 25
 (Taxation) c. 26

1515 (7 Hen. 8)

Note that cc. 7–11 were traditionally cited as Private Acts cc. 3, 1, 2, 4, and 5 respectively

 (Tillage) c. 1. The Act avoiding pulling down of Towns.
 (Navigation) c. 2. An Act for Maintenance of the King's Navy.
 (Penal actions) c. 3. The Act for Penal Statutes and Actions popular.
 (Avowries) c. 4. The Act for Avowries.
 (Labourers) c. 5. The Act for Labourers and Artificers within the City of London.
 (Apparel) c. 6. The Act of Apparel.
 (King's revenues) c. 7
 (The French Queen's jointure (on marriage to Duke of Suffolk)) c. 8
 (Subsidy) c. 9
 (Staple at Calais) c. 10
 (General pardon) c. 11

1523 (14 & 15 Hen. 8)

 (Cloths) c. 1. The Act concerning the conveying, transporting and carrying of Broad White Woollen Cloths out of this Realm.
 (Aliens) c. 2. The Act concerning the taking of Apprentices by Strangers.
 (Worsteds (Great Yarmouth)) c. 3. The Act concerning the draping of Worsteds, Sayes and Stamins, for the Town of Great Yarmouth.
 (Customs) c. 4. An Act for Payment of Custom.
 (Physicians) c. 5. An Act concerning Physicians.
 (Weald of Kent highways (diversion)) c. 6. An Act for George Guldeford to lay out a new Way.
 (Cross-bows) c. 7. The Act for shooting in Cross Bows and Hand Guns.
 (Six Clerks in Chancery may marry) c. 8. An Act that the Six Clerks of the Chancery may marry.
 (Cordwainers) c. 9. An Act concerning Cordwainers.
 (Killing hares) c. 10. An Act against tracing of Hares.
 (Cloths) c. 11. An Act for the Clothiers in Suffolk.
 (Coining) c. 12. An Act concerning coining of Money.
 (Port of Southampton) c. 13. An Act for the Haven or Port of Southampton.
 (Service in war) c. 14. An Act of Privilege for such Persons as are in the King's Wars.
 (Surveyors of Crown lands, etc.) c. 15
 (Taxation) c. 16
 (General pardon) c. 17
 (Royal Manor of Beaulieu) c. 18
 (Expenses of King's household) c. 19
 (Attainder of Edward late Duke of Buckingham) c. 20
 (Act of Auctorite (King's power to reverse attainders)) c. 21
 (Allowance to Duchess of Buckingham for her life) c. 22
 (Restitution of Henry Stafford and Ursula his wife) c. 23
 (Sale of land to Sir William Compton) c. 24
 (Sale of land to Thomas Kitson) c. 25
 (Sale of land to Sir Richard Sacheverell) c. 26
 (Grant to Lord Marny) c. 27
 (Tenure by castle ward service (as of Dover Castle)) c. 28
 (Saving for the merchants of the Hanse) c. 29
 (Grant to Earl of Northumberland) c. 30
 (Grants to Sir Andrew Windsor and Anthony Windsor) c. 31
 (Sir H Wyatt's lands in Kent disgavelled) c. 32
 (Grant to Earl of Shrewsbury) c. 33
 (Jointure of Elizabeth Talboys) c. 34
 (Geo. Roll, keeper of Common Bench records (tenure of office)) c. 35

1529 (21 Hen. 8)

Note that cc. 22–26 were traditionally cited as Private Acts cc. 1–5

 (General pardon) c. 1. The King's Highness his general Pardon.
 (Sanctuary) c. 2. An Act concerning such as shall take Sanctuary for Felony or Murder.
 (Real actions) c. 3. An Act concerning Delays in Assizes.
 (Executors) c. 4. An Act concerning Executors of last Wills and Testaments.
 (Probate fees, inventories, etc.) c. 5. An Act concerning Fines and Sums of Money to be taken by the Ministers of Bishops and other Ordinaries of Holy Church for the Probate of Testaments.
 Mortuaries Act 1529 c. 6. An Act concerning the taking of Mortuaries, or demanding, receiving or claiming of the same.
 (Embezzlement) c. 7. An Act for the Punishment of such Servants as shall withdraw themselves, and go away with their Masters' or Mistresses' Caskets and other Jewels or Goods, committed to them in Trust to be kept.
 (Killing calves) c. 8. An Act for the bringing up and rearing of Calves to increase the Multitude of Cattle.
 (Prices of foreign hats, etc.) c. 9. An Act limiting the Prices of Woollen Hats, Bonnets, and Caps made beyond the Seas, and brought to be sold within this Realm.
 (Exportation) c. 10. An Act against the carrying of Lattin, Brass and such Metal mixed beyond the Seas.
 (Restitution of goods stolen) c. 11. An Act for Restitution to be made of the Goods of such as shall be robbed by Felons.
 (Manufacture of cables, etc.) c. 12. An Act for the making of great Cables and Halsers, Ropes and all other Tackling for Ships, in the Borough of Burport, in the County of Dorset.
 (Clergy) c. 13. An Act that no Spiritual Persons shall take to farm, of the King or any other Person, any Lands or Tenements for Term of Life, Lives, Years or at Will, &c.; and for Pluralities of Benefices; and for Residence.
 (Importation) c. 14. An Act for the Linen Drapers in London.
 (Recoveries) c. 15. An Act that Tenants for Term of Years may falsify for their Term only, Recoveries had and made by their Lessors, to the defrauding of the said Termers' Interests.
 (Aliens) c. 16. An Act ratifying a Decree made in the Star Chamber, concerning Strangers and Handycraftsmen inhabiting the Realm of England.
 (Repeal of grant to York (shipping wool to Hull, etc.)) c. 17. An Act repealing a Grant lately made by the King's Highness to the Citizens of York, for the shipping of certain Wools into the Port of Hull.
 (Trade to Tyne) c. 18. An Act for the Town of Newcastle upon Tyne, concerning the shipping of Merchandize, and the unshipping thereof within, the Liberties of the said Town. — note that this Act is still in force
 (Avowries) c. 19. An Act concerning Avowries.
 (President of Council) c. 20. An Act that the President of the King's Counsel shall be associate with the Chancellor and Treasurer of England, and the Keeper of the King's Privy Seal.
 (Yarmouth worsteds) c. 21. An Act for Yarmouth concerning the making of Worsteds.
 (Assurance to Duke of Norfolk) c. 22
 (Will of John Rooper of Canterbury) c. 23 — note that this Act is still in force
 (Release of loans, etc.) c. 24
 (Wolsey attainder not to effect lands seized to uses) c. 25
 (Assurance to Duchess of Norfolk) c. 26

1530 (22 Hen. 8)

Note that cc. 17–23 were traditionally cited as Private Acts cc. 1–7

 (Regrators of wool) c. 1. An Act against Regrators and Gatherers of Wool.
 (Foreign pleas) c. 2. An Act for avoiding of foreign Pleas pleaded by Felons.
 (Plumstead Marsh (existing debts)) c. 3. An Act concerning Plumsted Marsh.
 (Apprentices' fees) c. 4. An Act concerning the avoiding of Exactions levied on Apprentices.
 Bridges Act 1530 c. 5. An Act concerning the Amendment of Bridges in Highways.
 (Butchers) c. 6. An Act for Butchers not to keep Tan-houses.
 (Exportation) c. 7. An Act against Conveyance of Horses out of this Realm.
 (Customs) c. 8. An Act for Denizens to pay Strangers Customs.
 Poisoning Act 1530 c. 9. An Act for Poisoning.
 Egyptians Act 1530 c. 10. An Act concerning Egyptians.
 (Powdyke in Marshland (malicious injury a felony)) c. 11. An Act concerning Powdike in Marsh-land.
 Vagabonds Act 1530 c. 12. An Act how aged, poor and impotent Persons, compelled to live by Alms, shall be ordered; and how Vagabonds and Beggars shall be punished.
 (Aliens) c. 13. An Act concerning Bakers, Brewers, Surgeons and Scriveners.
 (Abjuration, etc.) c. 14. An Act concerning Abjurations into Sanctuaries.
 (Pardon to clergy) c. 15. An Act concerning a Pardon granted to the King's Spiritual Subjects of the Province of Canterbury for the Premunire.
 (Pardon to laity) c. 16. An Act concerning the Pardon granted to the King's Temporal Subjects for the Premunire.
 (Duke of Richmond) c. 17
 (Expenses of King's household) c. 18
 (Assurance to heirs of Sir William Fyloll) c. 19
 (Town of Southampton) c. 20 — note that this Act is still in force
 (Exchange between King and heirs of Lord Montague) c. 21
 (Annuities granted out of Bishopric of Winchester) c. 22
 (Jointure of Countess of Derby) c. 23

1531 (23 Hen. 8)

Note that cc. 21–34 were traditionally cited as Private Acts cc. 1–14

 (Benefit of clergy) c. 1. An Act that no Person committing Petty Treason, Murder or Felony, shall be admitted to his Clergy, under Subdeacon.
 (Gaols) c. 2. An Act concerning where and under what Manner the Gaols within this Realm shall be edified and made.
 (Attaints) c. 3. An Act concerning Perjury, and Punishment of untrue Verdicts.
 (Brewers and coopers) c. 4. An Act that no Brewers of Beer or Ale shall make their Barrels, Kilderkins nor Firkins, within them; and how much the same Barrels, &c. shall contain.
 (Statute of Sewers) c. 5. A General Act concerning Commissions of Sewers to be directed in all Parts within this Realm.
 (Recognizances for debt) c. 6. An Act concerning before whom Recognizances of Debts shall be made, and the Form of the Obligation.
 (Foreign Wines) c. 7. An Act that the Statutes made for the Maintenance of the Navy of this Realm shall stand in full Strength; and how Gascoigne and French Wines shall be brought in, and the same and other Wines sold.
 (Tin (maintenance of ports in Devon and Cornwall)) c. 8. An Act for the amending and Maintenance of the Havens and Ports of Plymouth, Dartmouth, Teignmouth, Falmouth and Fowey, in the Counties of Devon and Cornwall.
 Ecclesiastical Jurisdiction Act 1531 c. 9. An Act that no Person shall be cited out of the Diocese where he or she dwelleth, except in certain Cases.
 (Mortmain) c. 10. An Act for Feoffments and Assurances of Lands and Tenements made to the Use of any Parish Church, Chapel or such like.
 (Breaking prison) c. 11. An Act for breaking of Prison by Clerks convict.
 (Tolls, Severn side) c. 12. An Act for taking Exactions upon the Paths of Severn.
 (Juries in towns (qualification)) c. 13. An Act that Men in Cities, Boroughs and Towns, which be clearly worth Forty Pounds in Goods, shall pass in Trial of Murders.
 (Outlawry) c. 14. Process of Outlawry to lie in Actions on 5 Rich. 2. [and] in Covenant and Annuity.
 (Costs) c. 15. An Act that the Defendant shall recover Costs against the Plaintiff, if the Plaintiff be nonsuited, or if the Verdict pass against him.
 (Conveyance of horses into Scotland) c. 16. An Act that no Englishman shall sell, exchange or deliver, to be conveyed into Scotland, any Horse, Gelding or Mare, without the King's Licence.
 (Winding of wool) c. 17. An Act for true winding of Wools.
 (Fish) c. 18. An Act for pulling down and avoiding of Fish-garths, Piles, Stakes, Hecks and other Engines set in the River and Water of Ouse and Humber.
 (Pardon to clergy) c. 19. An Act concerning the King's gracious Pardon of Premunire granted unto his Spiritual Subjects of the Province of York.
 (Payment of annates) c. 20. An Act concerning Restraint of Payment of Annates to the See of Rome.
 (Exchange of lands, King and Abbot of Westminster) c. 21
 (Exchange of lands, King and Christ's College, Cambridge) c. 22
 (Exchange of lands, King and Abbot of Waltham) c. 23
 (Exchange of lands, King and Provost of Eton) c. 24
 (Exchange of lands, King and Abbot of St Albans) c. 25
 (Exchange of lands, King and Prior of St John of Jerusalem) c. 26
 (Exchange of lands, King and Prior of Sheene) c. 27
 (Exchange of lands, King, Duke of Richmond and Lord Lumley) c. 28
 (Lands of Earl of Surrey) c. 29
 (Manor of Hunsdon) c. 30
 (Jointure of Countess of Wiltshire) c. 31
 (Award to heirs of Earl of Oxford) c. 32
 (Jointure of dowager Countess of Oxford and Countess of Oxford) c. 33
 (Attainder of Gruffyth and Hughes) c. 34

1532 (24 Hen. 8)

Note that cc. 14–16 were traditionally cited as Private Acts cc. 1–3

 (Leather) c. 1. An Act concerning true tanning and currying of Leather.
 (Woollen cloth) c. 2. An Act concerning the true dying of Woollen Cloth.
 (Sale of flesh) c. 3. An Act for Flesh to be sold by Weight.
 (Flax and hemp) c. 4. An Act concerning sowing of Flax and Hemp.
 (Killing murderers, robbers, and burglars) c. 5. An Act where a Man killing evil disposed persons, shall not forfeit his Goods.
 (Sale of wines) c. 6. An Act concerning Sale of Wines.
 (Killing calves) c. 7. An Act to continue and renew the Act made against killing of Calves.
 (Costs) c. 8. An Act where Defendants shall not recover any Costs.
 (Killing weanlings) c. 9. An Act against killing of young Beasts called Weanlings.
 (Destruction of crows, etc.) c. 10. An Act made and ordained to destroy Choughs, Crows and Rooks.
 (Highway paving between Strond Cross and Charing Cross) c. 11. An Act for paving of the Highway between the Strond Cross and Charing Cross.
 Ecclesiastical Appeals Act 1532 c. 12. An Act that the Appeals in such Cases as have been used to be pursued to the See of Rome, shall not be from henceforth had pursued but within this Realm.
 (Apparel) c. 13. An Act for Reformation of Excess in Apparel.
 (Lands of Walter Walsh) c. 14
 (Repeal of letters patent to Corporation of Hull) c. 15
 (London butchers) c. 16

1533 (25 Hen. 8)

Note that cc. 23–34 were traditionally cited as Private Acts cc. 1–5, 7, 6, 8, 12, and 9–11 respectively

 (Graziers and butchers) c. 1. An Act concerning Graziers and Butchers.
 (Price of victuals) c. 2. An Act of Proclamation to be made concerning Victuals.
 Standing Mute, etc. Act 1533 c. 3. An Act for standing mute, and peremptory Challenge.
 (Fish) c. 4. An Act against Forestalling and Regrating of Fish.
 (Worsteds) c. 5. An Act for Calendering of Worsteds.
 Buggery Act 1533 c. 6. An Act for the Punishment of the Vice of Buggery.
 (Fish) c. 7. An Act against killing of young Spawn or Fry of Eels and Salmon.
 (Holborn street paving) c. 8. An Act for paving of Holborn.
 (Pewterers) c. 9. An Act concerning Pewterers.
 (Oath of commissioners of sewers) c. 10. An Act concerning the Acceptance of the Oath to the Act of Sewers.
 (Wild-fowl) c. 11. An Act against Destruction of Wild-Fowl.
 (Treason of Elizabeth Barton (pretended revelations)) c. 12. An Act concerning the Attainder of Elizabeth Barton and others.
 (Tillage) c. 13. An Act concerning Farms and Sheep.
 (Heresy) c. 14. An Act for Punishment of Heresy.
 (Printers and binders) c. 15. An Act for Printers and Binders of Books.
 (Clergy) c. 16. An Act that every Judge of the High Courts may have One Chaplain beneficed with Cure.
 (Cross-bows) c. 17. An Act for shooting in Cross Bows and Hand Guns.
 (Cloths) c. 18. An Act for Clothiers within the Shire of Worcester.
 Submission of the Clergy Act 1533 c. 19 (still in force). An Act for the Submission of the Clergy to the King's Majesty.
 Appointment of Bishops Act 1533 c. 20 (still in force). An Act restraining the Payment of Annates.
 Ecclesiastical Licences Act 1533 c. 21 (still in force). An Act concerning the Exoneration of the King's Subjects from Exactions and Impositions heretofore paid to the See of Rome; and for having Licences and Dispensations within this Realm, without suing further for the same.
 Succession to the Crown Act 1533 c. 22. An Act declaring the Establishment of Succession of the King's most Royal Majesty in the Imperial Crown of this Realm.
 (Discharge of payment by Plymouth to Plympton monastery) c. 23
 (Exchange of lands, Duke of Norfolk and Earl of Oxford) c. 24
 (Queen's jointure) c. 25
 (Exchange of lands, King and Abbot of Waltham) c. 26
 (Deprivation of Bishops of Sarum and Worcester) c. 27
 (Queen Katherine) c. 28
 (Bishop of Norwich (pardon and restoration)) c. 29
 (Exchange between King, Duke of Richmond and Lord Lumley) c. 30
 (Assurance of Manor of Pyssowe) c. 31
 (Pardon of Richard Southwell and others) c. 32
 (Assurance of Christchurch, London to the King) c. 33
 (Attainder of John Wolff and others) c. 34 An Acte concernyng the attaynder of John Wolff his wyffe and others

1534 (26 Hen. 8)

Note that c. 19 was not included in traditional collection of Acts, and that cc. 20–26 were traditionally cited as Private Acts cc. 1–7

 Act of Supremacy 1534 c. 1. An Act concerning the King's Highness to be Supreme Head of the Church of England, and to have Authority to reform and redress all Errors, Heresies and Abuses in the same.
 Succession to the Crown Act 1534 c. 2. An Act ratifying the Oath that every of the King's Subjects hath taken, and shall hereafter be bound to take, for due Observation of the Act made for the Surety of the Succession of the King's Highness in the Crown of the Realm.
 (First fruits and tenths) c. 3. An Act concerning the Payments of First-fruits of all Dignities, Benefices and Promotions Spiritual; and also concerning one annual Pension of the tenth Part of all the Possessions of the Church, Spiritual and Temporal, granted to the King's Highness and his Heirs.
 (Jurors in Wales) c. 4. An Act for Punishment of Perjury of Jurors in the Lordships Marchers in Walts.
 (Ferries on the Severn) c. 5. An Act that Keepers of Ferries on the Water of Severn shall not convey in their Ferry-boats any manner of Person, Goods or Chattels, after the Sun going down till the Sun be up.
 (Marches in Wales) c. 6. An Act that Murthers and Felonies done or committed within any Lordship Marcher in Wales, shall be inquired of at the Sessions holden within the Shire Grounds next adjoining; with many goods Orders for Ministration of Justice there to be had.
 (Sussex highway (diversion)) c. 7. An Act for amending of Highways in Sussex.
 (Rebuilding at Norwich (after the fire)) c. 8. An Act for the Re-edifying of void Grounds in the City of Norwich.
 (Rebuilding at Lynn Bishop, Norfolk) c. 9. An Act for the Re-edifying of void Grounds within the Town of Lynne.
 (Importation, etc.) c. 10. An Act whereby the King's Highness hath Authority to repeal the Statute made for Restraint of Wines to come in afore Candlemas.
 (Assaults by Welshmen) c. 11. An Act for Punishment of Welshmen attempting any Assaults or Affrays upon any the Inhabitants of Hereford, Gloucester and Shropshire.
 (Purgation of convicts in Wales) c. 12. An Act for Purgation of Convicts in Wales.
 Treasons Act 1534 c. 13. An Act whereby divers Offences be made High Treason.
 Suffragan Bishops Act 1534 c. 14 (still in force). An Act for Nomination and Consecration of Suffragans within this Realm.
 (Abolition of mortuaries in Richmond, Yorkshire) c. 15. An Act for taking away certain Exactions taken within the Archdeaconry of Richmond by Spiritual Men.
 (Worsteds (Norwich, Lynn, and Yarmouth)) c. 16. An Act for making of Worsteds in the City of Norwich, and in the Towns of Lyn and Yarmouth.
 (First fruits and tenths) c. 17. An Act that no Farmers of Spiritual Persons shall be compelled or charged to pay for their Leaser's First Fruits, or Year's Pension of the Tenth, granted to the King's Highness.
 (General pardon) c. 18. An Act concerning the King's general and free Pardon granted by his Highness.
 (Taxation) c. 19. An Act containing a Grant of Subsidy unto the King's Highness for a Fifteenth and Tenth.
 (Assurance of lands to Duke of Norfolk) c. 20
 (Assurance of lands to Duke of Richmond) c. 21
 (Attainder of the Bishop of Rochester and others) c. 22
 (Attainder of Sir Thomas More) c. 23
 (Exchange, King and Abbot of Waltham) c. 24
 (Attainder of the Earl of Kildare) c. 25
 (Merchants of the Stylyard) c. 26

1535 (27 Hen. 8)

Note that cc. 29–59, 61–63 were traditionally cited as Private Acts cc. 1–31, 32–34 respectively, and that c. 60 was not included in traditional collections of Acts

 (Rebuilding in various towns) c. 1. An Act for Re-edifying of divers Towns in the Realm.
 Forging the Sign-manual, etc. Act 1535 c. 2. An Act concerning the Forging of the King's Sign Manual, Signet and Privy Seal.
 (Kingston upon Hull) c. 3. An Act for avoiding of Exactions taken at Kyngston upon Hull.
 (Offences at sea) c. 4. An Act concerning Pirates and Robbers of the Sea.
 (Justice of the Peace (Chester and Wales)) c. 5. An Act for the making of Justices of Peace in Wales.
 Breed of Horses Act 1535 c. 6. An Act concerning the Breed of Horses.
 (Forests in Wales) c. 7. An Act for the Abuses in the Forests of Wales.
 (First fruits and tenths) c. 8. An Act for Discharge of Payment of the Tenth in that Year in which they pay their First Fruits.
 (Butchers) c. 9. An Act licensing all Butchers for a time to sell Vytell in Grose at their Pleasure.
 Statute of Uses c. 10. An Act concerning Uses and Wills.
 (Clerks of the Signet and Privy Seal) c. 11. An Act concerning Clerks of the Signet and Privy Seal.
 (Woollen cloths) c. 12. An Act for true making of Woollen Clothes.
 (Exportation) c. 13. An Act that White Woollen Cloths of Four Pounds and under, and coloured Cloths of Three Pounds and under, may be from henceforth carried over the Sea.
 (Customs) c. 14. An Act concerning the Custom of Leather.
 (Ecclesiastical canons) c. 15. An Act whereby the King's Majesty shall have Power to nominate Thirty two Persons of his Clergy and Lay Fee for making of Ecclesiastical Laws.
 Statute of Enrolments (Enrolment of bargains of lands, etc.) c. 16. An Act concerning Inrollments of Bargains and Contracts of Lands and Tenements.
 (Embezzlement) c. 17. An Act concerning such as be put in Trust by their Masters, and after do rob them.
 (Thames conservancy ships' ballast, etc.) c. 18. An Act for the Preservation of the River of Thames.
 (Sanctuary) c. 19. An Act limiting an Order for Sanctuaries and Sanctuary Persons.
 (Tithes) c. 20. An Act containing an Order for Tithes throughout the Realm.
 (Tithes, London) c. 21. An Act limiting an Order for Payment of Tithes within the City of London.
 (Tillage) c. 22. An Act concerning Decay of Houses and Inclosures.
 (Tin (preservation of ports in Devon and Cornwall)) c. 23. An Act for the Preservation of Havens and Ports in the Counties of Devon and Cornwall.
 Jurisdiction in Liberties Act 1535 c. 24. An Act for continuing of certain Liberties and Franchises heretofore taken from the Crown.
 (Vagabonds) c. 25. An Act for Punishment of sturdy Vagabonds and Beggars
 Laws in Wales Act 1535 c. 26 (repealed 1993 (c. 38)). An Act for Laws and Justice to be ministered in Wales in like Form as it is in this Realm.
 (Court of Augmentations) c. 27. An Act establishing the Court of Augmentations.
 Suppression of Religious Houses Act 1535 c. 28. An Act that all Religious Houses under the yearly Revenue of Two hundred Pounds shall be dissolved and given to the King and his Heirs.
 (Assurance of Manor of Grenes Norton) c. 29
 (Jointure of Lady Elizabeth Vaux) c. 30
 (Lands of Lord Awdeley) c. 31
 (Agreement, Earl of Rutland and City of York) c. 32
 (Exchange of lands, King, Duke of Norfolk and Prior of Thetford) c. 33
 (Exchange of lands, King and Archbishop of Canterbury) c. 34
 (Land reclamation (Wapping marsh)) c. 35
 (Jointure of Lady Clifford) c. 36
 (Pardon to Duke of Suffolk) c. 37
 (Exchange of lands, King, Duke of Suffolk and Earl of Northumberland) c. 38
 (Assurance of lands to King and Duke of Suffolk) c. 39
 (Agreement, Duke of Suffolk and Sir Christopher Willoughby) c. 40
 (Assurance of lands to Queen Anne for her life) c. 41
 (Universities and Colleges exempt from first fruits and tenths) c. 42
 (Award Sir Piers Dutton and Sir William Molineux) c. 43
 (Partition of lands between the heirs of Lord Broke) c. 44
 (Assurance to King of temporalities of See of Norwich) c. 45
 (Partition of lands Lord Thomas Howard and Sir Thomas Poynings) c. 46
 (Assurance to King of land of Earl of Northumberland) c. 47
 (Assurance of lands to Lord Chancellor Awdeley) c. 48
 (Assurance of lands in Cheape to City of London) c. 49
 (Assurance of Manor of Halynge to King) c. 50
 (Assurance of Manor of Collyweston to Queen) c. 51
 (Exchange of lands, King and Corpus Christi College, Oxford) c. 52
 (Exchange of lands, King and Prior of Marton Abbey) c. 53
 (Assurance of lands to Sir Arthur Darcy) c. 54
 (Assurance of lands to Anne Fitzwilliam) c. 55
 (Assurance of land to Lord William Howard) c. 56
 (Assurance of lands to Thomas Pope) c. 57
 (Annulment of feofment by Sir Thomas More) c. 58
 (Attainder of John Lewes) c. 59
 (Tenths) c. 60
 (Assurance of Manor of Bromhill to King) c. 61
 (Surveyors of Crown lands) c. 62
 (Ordinances for Calais) c. 63

1536 (28 Hen. 8)

Note that cc. 18–52 were traditionally cited as Private Acts cc. 1–35

 (Abjuration, benefit of clergy) c. 1. An Act that Felons abjuring for Petit Treason, Murder or Felony, shall not be admitted to the Benefit of their Clergy.
 (Embezzlement) c. 2. An Act for continuing of two Statutes made in the last Parliament, touching such as go away with Caskets, Jewels, Goods or Plate of their Masters.
 (Wales) c. 3. An Act giving the King's Highness Authority newly to allot the Townships in the Shires and Marches of Wales at any Time within three Years next ensuing.
 (Cloths) c. 4. An Act repealing the Statute lately made for the bringing in of Doulas and Lockerams.
 Apprentices Act 1536 c. 5. An Act for avoiding of Exactions taken upon Prentices in the Cities, Boroughs and Towns Corporate.
 (Continuance of Acts) c. 6. An Act made for continuing of the Statutes for Beggars and Vagabonds; and against Conveyance of Horses and Mares out of this Realm; against Welshmen making Affrays in the Counties of Hereford, Gloucester and Salop; and against the Vice of Buggery.
 (Succession to the Crown: marriage) c. 7. An Act for the Establishment of the Succession of the Imperial Crown of this Realm.
 (Continuance of Acts) c. 8. An Act for Continuance of the Statutes against the Carriage of Brass, Laten and Copper out of this Realm; and for making of Cables and Ropes; and others.
 (Continuance of Acts) c. 9. An Act for Continuance of the Statutes of Perjury; for making of Jayles; for Pewterers; and for sowing of Flax and Hemp.
 See of Rome Act 1536 c. 10. An Act extinguishing the Authority of the Bishop of Rome.
 Tithe Act 1536 c. 11 (still in force). An Act for Restitution of the First Fruits in Time of Vacation to the next Incumbent.
 (Palace of Westminster) c. 12. An Act declaring the Limits of the King's Palace of Westminster. — this Act is still in force
 (Clergy) c. 13. An Act compelling Spiritual Persons to keep Residence upon their Benefices.
 (Wines) c. 14. An Act limiting the Prices of Wines.
 Offences at Sea Act 1536 c. 15. An Act for Punishment of Pirates and Robbers of the Sea.
 Ecclesiastical Licences Act 1536 c. 16. An Act for the Release of such as have obtained pretended Licences and Dispensations from The See of Rome.
 (Repeal of Acts) c. 17. An Act giving authority to such as shall succeed to the Crown of this Realm when they shall come to the age of xxiv years to make frustrate such acts as shall be made before in their time.
 (Treason) c. 18.
 (Assurance of lands to St. Saviour's Bermondsey, to King) c. 19
 (Assurance of lands to Dame Grace Parker) c. 20
 (Exchange of lands, King and Prior of St. John of Jerusalem) c. 21
 (Assurance of lands of Earl of Warwick to King) c. 22
 (Pension to late Bishop of Chichester) c. 23
 (Attainder of Lord Thomas Howard) c. 24
 (Assurance of lands to Lord Beauchamp) c. 25
 (Assurance of lands at Kew to Lord Beauchamp) c. 26
 (Church of Elsing Spytle, parish church of St Alphes) c. 27 — this Act is still in force
 (Assurance of Richard's castle to John Onley) c. 28
 (Exchange of lands, King and Abbot of Westminster) c. 29
 (Assurance of Stanton Barrey to King) c. 30
 (Enlarging St Margaret's churchyard Southwark) c. 31 — this Act is still in force
 (Assurance of lands to King from Sir William Essex and others) c. 32
 (Exchange, King and Bishop of Durham) c. 33
 (Assurance of Baynard's Castle to Duke of Richmond) c. 34
 (Exchange of lands, King and Lord Sandys) c. 35
 (Award, Sir Adrian Fortescue and Sir Walter Stonor) c. 36
 (Marriage of Richard Devereux) c. 37
 (Assurance of Manors of Southwark and Parysgarden Hyde to Queen) c. 38
 (Assurance of lands of Earldom of March to King) c. 39
 (Assurance of Manor of Kyrteling to Edward North) c. 40
 (Assurance of Manor of Birmingham to King) c. 41
 (Exchange of lands, King and Abbot of Abingdon) c. 42
 (Assurance of lands to Thomas Jermyn) c. 43
 (Assurance of Manor of Haslingfield to Prior of Charterhouse) c. 44
 (Jointure of Queen Jane) c. 45
 (Assurance of lands to Thomas Hatcliffe) c. 46
 (Assurance of lands to John Gostwick) c. 47
 (Marriage of Lord Bulbeck) c. 48
 (Exchange of lands, King and Abbot of Westminster) c. 49
 (Exchange of lands, King, Archbishop of Canterbury and Thomas Cromwell) c. 50
 (Assurance of lands to Duchess of Suffolk) c. 51
 (Lands of Lord Rochford and other persons attainted) c. 52

1539 (31 Hen. 8)

Public Acts

 (Joint tenants and tenants in common) c. 1. An Act concerning Joint Tenants and Tenants in Common.
 (Fishing) c. 2. An Act that fishing in any several Pond, Stew or Mote, with an Intent to steal Fish out of the same, is Felony.
 (Certain lands in Kent disgavelled) c. 3. An Act changing the Custom of Gavelkind.
 (River Exe) c. 4. An Act concerning the amending of the River and Port of Exeter. — this Act is still in force
 (Manor of Hampton Court) c. 5. An Act whereby the King's Manor of Hampton Court is made an Honour, and a new Chase thereto belonging.
 (Monasteries, etc.) c. 6. An Act that such as were religious Persons may purchase, sue and be sued, in all manner of Actions.
 (Continuance of Acts) c. 7. An Act concerning the Continuance of the Statute for Punishment of Beggars and Vagabonds, and of certain other Statutes.
 Proclamation by the Crown Act 1539 c. 8. An Act that Proclamations made by the King's Highness, with the Advice of His Honourable Council, shall be obeyed, and kept as though they were made by Act of Parliament.
 (Bishops) c. 9. An Act authorising the King's Highness to make Bishops by his Letters Patent.
 House of Lords Precedence Act 1539 c. 10 (still in force). An Act concerning placing of the Lords in the Parliament Chamber, and other Assemblies and Conferences of Council.
 (Wales) c. 11. Act authorising the King's Highness newly to allot certain Townships in Wales.
 (Taking of hawks) c. 12. An Act concerning wrongful taking of Hawks' Eggs and Birds out of the Nests; finding and taking up of the King's Hawks; hunting in the King's Forest, Park or Chase, or other Ground inclosed; and killing of Conies within any lawful Warren of the King's.
 Suppression of Religious Houses Act 1539 c. 13. An Act for the Dissolution of all Monasteries and Abbies.
 (Religion) c. 14 (Statute of the Six Articles). An Act for abolishing of Diversity of Opinions of certain Articles concerning Christian Religion.

Private Acts

Attainder of Marquis of Exeter and others. c. 15
Lady Taylboys' jointure. c. 16
Assurance of Mansion House in St. Laurence Pountney to Earl of Sussex.	c. 17
Assurance of Chester Place to Earl of Hertford. c. 18
Assurance of Rycott Manor to Sir John Williams. c. 19
Lady Rochford's jointure. c. 20
Assurance of lands to Sir Christopher Hales. c. 21
Restitution of Sir Henry Norreis. c. 22
Assurance of lands to Sir Richard Rich. c. 23
Assurance of lands to Sir Henry Long and Sir Thomas Seymour. c. 24
Assurance of Bath Place to Earl of Southampton. c. 25
Exchange between Bishops of Rochester and Carlisle and Lord Russell. c. 26
Chancery Clerks' House. c. 27
Assurance of lands to Wyatt and Culpeper. c. 28

1540 (32 Hen. 8)

Public Acts

 (Wills) c. 1. An Act how Lands may be willed by Testament.
 (Limitation of prescription) c. 2. An Act for Limitation of Prescription.
 (Perpetuation of Acts) c. 3. An Act for the Continuation of certain Acts.
 Treasons in Wales Act 1540 c. 4. An Act for Trial of Treasons in Wales.
 (Execution) c. 5. An Act for Contentation of Debts upon Execution.
 (Conveyance of horses into Scotland) c. 6. An Act for Trial of Felonies upon conveying of Horses into Scotland.
 Tithe Act 1540 c. 7. An Act for the true Payment of Tithes and Offerings.
 (Game) c. 8. An Act against Sellers and Buyers of Pheasants and Partridges.
 Maintenance and Embracery Act 1540 c. 9. An Act against Maintenance, Embracery; and against unlawful buying of Titles.
 (Priests, etc.) c. 10. An Act for the Moderation of the Punishment of Incontinency of Priests and Women offending with them.
 (Stealing hawks' eggs, etc.) c. 11. An Act concerning stealing of Hawk's Eggs, Conies and Deer.
 (Sanctuaries) c. 12. An Act concerning Sanctuaries, Privileges of Churches and Church-yards.
 (Horses) c. 13. An Act concerning the Breed of Horses of higher Stature.
 (Navigation) c. 14. An Act for Maintenance of the Navy of England, and for certain Rates of Freights.
 (Religion) c. 15. An Act concerning Archbishops, Bishops, their Chancellors, Commissary, Archdeacons and their Officials, to be in the Commission of the Act concerning the Abolition of erroneous Opinions in Christian Religion.
 (Aliens) c. 16. An Act concerning Strangers.
 (Paving of Holborn, Aldgate, etc.) c. 17. An Act for paving of Aldgate to Whitechapel, High Holborn, Chancery Lane, Grays-Inn Lane, Shoe Lane and Feuther Lane.
 (Rebuilding of certain towns) c. 18. An Act for re-edifying of decayed Houses in sundry Towns, and Places of the Realm.
 (Rebuilding of West Country towns) c. 19. An Act for re-edifying of decayed Houses in sundry Towns of the West Parts.
 (Suppression of monasteries) c. 20. An Act concerning Privileges and Franchises.
 (Trinity term) c. 21. An Act for the Abbreviation and Limitation of Trinity Term.
 (Tenths) c. 22. An Act concerning the Accounts of Bishops and others, for the Tenth granted to the King's Majesty.
 (Taxation) c. 23. The Subsidy of the Clergy of the Province of Canterbury.
 (Hospital of Saint John of Jerusalem (possessions, etc.)) c. 24. An Act concerning the Lands and Goods of the Hospitals of St. John of Jerusalem in England and Ireland, to be hereafter in the King's Hands and Disposition.
 (Succession to the Crown) c. 25. An Act declaring the Dissolution of the King's pretensed Marriage with the Lady Anne of Cleves.
 (Religion) c. 26. An Act concerning true Opinions and Declarations of Christ's Religion.
 (Certain recent grants and licences avoided) c. 27. An Act for the Resumption of extraordinary Grants and of Licences of Absence; and Reversions in the Town of Calais, and the Marches of the same, and in Berwick; and of the Sheriffwicks for Life in Wales.
 (Leases) c. 28. An Act that Lessees shall enjoy their Farms against the Tenants in Tail.
 (Lands at Oswaldbeck, Nottinghamshire (descent)) c. 29. An Act concerning customable Lands in Osweldebek Soke.
 (Mispleadings, jeofails, etc.) c. 30. An Act concerning Mispleading, Jeofails and Attorneys.
 (Recoveries) c. 31. An Act for the avoiding of Recoveries by Collusion, by Tenants for Term of Life.
 (Joint tenants for life or years) c. 32. An Act concerning Joint Tenants for Term of Life or Years.
 (Disseisin) c. 33. An Act that wrongful Disseisin is no Descent in the Law.
 (Grantees of reversions) c. 34. An Act concerning Grantees of Reversions to take Advantage of the Conditions to be performed by the Lessees.
 (Forest) c. 35. An Act that Justices of Forests may make Deputies.
 (Fines) c. 36. An Act for the Exposition of the Statute of Fines.
 Cestui que vie Act 1540 c. 37. For Recovery of Arrearages of Rents by Executors of Tenant in Fee-simple.
 Marriage Act 1540 c. 38. An Act concerning Pre-contracts of Marriages, and touching Degrees of Consanguinity.
 (King's household) c. 39. The Jurisdiction of the Great Master of the King's Household.
 Physicians Act 1540 c. 40. An Act concerning the Privileges of Physicians.
 (Horsebread) c. 41. An Act concerning baking of Horse-bread.
 (Concerning barbers and chirurgians) c. 42. An Act concerning Barbers and Surgeons to be of one Company.
 (Shire days in County of Chester) c. 43. An Act concerning Shire-days in the County Palatine of Chester.
 (Royston) c. 44. An Act that the Town of Roysten is reduced to one new Parish.
 (Court of First Fruits and Tenths) c. 45. The Erection of the Court of the First-fruits and Tenths.
 (Court of Wards) c. 46. An Act for the Establishment of the Court of the King's Wards.
 (Payment of tenths by Bishop of Norwich) c. 47. An Act that the Bishop of Norwich shall be charged with the Collection of the King's Tenth, in his Diocese.
 (Tenure as of Castle of Dover) c. 48. An Act concerning the Castle of Dover, Castle-Wards, and other Munitions thereabout.
 (General pardon) c. 49. An Act concerning the King's most gracious, general and free Pardon.
 (Taxation) c. 50. An Act for the Grant of two Subsidies, and four Fifteenths and Tenths to the King by the Temporalty.
 Queen Consort Act 1540 c. 51

Private Acts

Cancellation of unpaid debts in Cofferer's custody. c. 52
Creation of the Honour of Ewelme by separating the Honour of Wallingford from the Duchy of Cornwall and uniting it to the manor of Ewelme. c. 53
Uniting various manors to Windsor Castle. c. 54
Honour of Hampton Court: annexation of the Manor of Nonsuch. c. 55
Uniting various manors to the Honour of Petworth. c. 56
County Palatine of Duchy of Lancaster: placing the Monastery of Furness within the survey, letting and setting of the Chancellor and officers of the county. c. 57
Attainder of Giles Heron. c. 58
Attainders of Richard Fetherston, Thomas Abell, Edward Powell, William Horne, Laurence Cooke and Margaret Tyrrell for adherence to the Church of Rome. c. 59
Attainders of Butolph, Damplipp, Brindholme, Philpot, Gryning, Barnes, Geratt, Jerome and Carewe for adherence to the Church of Rome. c. 60
Attainders of William Byrd, Lord Hungerford and others. c. 61
Attainder of Lord Cromwell. c. 62
Exchange of lands between King and Prebend of Rugemore. c. 63
Creating the Parish of St. Saviour, Southwark by uniting the parishes of St. Margaret and St. Mary Magdalen. c. 64
Resumption of the assignment made of the King's Household. c. 65
Sale between King and Sir Richard Rich. c. 66
Assurance of Rotherfield Greys (Oxfordshire) to Sir Frances Knolles. c. 67
Exchange of lands between the King and Elizabeth Hill. c. 68
Audrey Hare's estate: enabling her to sell land despite her minority. c. 69
Richard Long, concerning Shingay. c. 70
Sir Edward and Dame Isabel Baynton. c. 71
Assurance of lands to Harper. c. 72
Exchange between the King and Duke of Norfolk. c. 73
Exchange between the King and Lord La Warr. c. 74
Concerning Mr. Wyatt. c. 75
Exchange between Lord Audley, Sir Thomas Poynings and others. c. 76
Exchange between the King and Mr Wyat. c. 77
Assurance of lands to the Earl of Hertford. c. 78
Marquis of Dorset and Lord John Gray. c. 79
Exchange of lands between the King and the Duke of Norfolk. c. 80

1541 (33 Hen. 8)

Public Acts

 (Counterfeit letters, etc.) c. 1. An Act concerning counterfeit Letters or privy Tokens to receive Money or Goods in other Men's Names.
 (Fish) c. 2. An Act concerning buying of Fish upon the Sea.
 (Welsh) c. 3. An Act for folding of Cloths in North Wales.
 (Pewterers) c. 4. An Act concerning Pewterers.
 (Horses) c. 5. An Act concerning keeping of great Horses.
 (Cross-bows) c. 6. An Act concerning Cross-bows and Hand-guns.
 (Exportation) c. 7. An Act concerning the Conveyance of Brass, Latten and Bell-metal over the Sea.
 Witchcraft Act 1541 c. 8. An Act against Conjurations, Witchcrafts, Sorcery and Inchantments.
 Unlawful Games Act 1541 c. 9. An Act for the Maintenance of Artillery, and debarring unlawful Games.
 (Justice of the Peace) c. 10. An Act concerning the Execution of certain Statutes.
 (Butchers) c. 11. An Act for Butchers to sell at their Liberty by Weight or otherwise.
 Offences within the Court Act 1541 c. 12. An Act for Murder and malicious Bloodshed within the Court.
 (Lordships of Wales) c. 13. An Act concerning certain Lordships translated from the County of Denbigh to the County of Flint.
 (Prophecies) c. 14. An Act concerning false Prophecies upon Declaration of Names, Arms or Badges.
 (Sanctuary) c. 15. An Act touching the Translation of the Sanctuary from Manchester to Westchester.
 (Worsted yarn) c. 16. An Act for Worsted Yarn in Norfolk.
 (Continuation of Acts) c. 17. An Act for Confirmation and Continuation of certain Acts.
 (Kerseys) c. 18. An Act for true making of Kerseys.
 (Exportation) c. 19. An Act expounding a certain Statute concerning the shipping of Cloths.
 (Consequences of attainder for treason) c. 20. An Act for due Process to be had in High Treasons, in Cases of Lunacy or Madness.
 Royal Assent by Commission Act 1541 c. 21. An Act concerning the Attainder of the late Queen Catherine and her Complices.
 (Wards and liveries) c. 22. An Act concerning the Order of Wards and Liveries.
 (Criminal law) c. 23. An Act to proceed by Commission of Oyer and Determiner against such Persons as shall confess Treason, &c., without remanding the same to be tried in the Shire where the Offence was committed.
 (Justices of assize, etc.) c. 24. An Act that no Man shall be Justice of Assise in his own Country.
 (Naturalization of certain children born overseas) c. 25. An Act for making free certain Children born, beyond the Sea, and to put the same Children in the Nature of mere Englishmen.
 (Conveyances by Sir John Shelton made void) c. 26. An Act to make frustrate certain Conveyances devised by Sir John Shelton.
 Leases by Corporations Act 1541 c. 27. An Act for Leases of Hospitals, Colleges and other Corporations to be good and effectual with the Consent of the more Party.
 (Clergy) c. 28. An Act for the Chancellor of the Duchy of Lancaster, the Chancellor of the Augmentations, and certain other Noblemen, to retain Chaplains.
 (Monasteries, etc.) c. 29. An Act to enable Persons late Religious to sue and to be sued.
 (Coventry and Lichfield) c. 30. An Act confirming the Authority of the Dean and Chapter of Lichfield making Leases and other Grants.
 Bishoprics of Chester and Man Act 1541 c. 31. An Act dissevering the Bishoprick of Chester, and of the Isle of Man, from the jurisdiction of Canterbury to the Jurisdiction of York.
 (Whitegate church, Chester) c. 32. An Act for the Parish Church of Whitegate to be made a Parish Church of itself, and no Part of the Parish of Over.
 (Hull Corporation and fishermen) c. 33. An Act concerning the Privileges of Kingston upon Hull.
 (Fairs at King's Lynn) c. 34. An Act for the Town of Lyne, touching the Revocation of two Fairs.
 (Gloucester water supply) c. 35. An Act concerning the Conduits at Gloucester.
 (Repair of Canterbury and other towns) c. 36. An Act for repairing of Canterbury, Rochester, Stamford, and divers other Towns.
 (Honour of Ampthill) c. 37. An Act touching the Honour of Ampthyll.
 (Honour of Grafton) c. 38. An Act concerning the Honour of Grafton.
 Crown Debts Act 1541 c. 39. An Act concerning the Erection of the Court of Surveyors.

Private Acts

Attainder of Richard Pate and Seth Hollond. c. 40
Assurance of the manor of Grafton and Upton Warren [Worcestershire] to Sir Gilbert Talbot. c. 41
Uniting the prebend of Blewbury [Berkshire] to the Bishop of Salisbury and granting the lands of Godalming to Thomas Paston in exchange. c. 42
Exchange of houses between Lord Admiral and Bishop of Rochester. c. 43
King's College, Cambridge. c. 44
Marchioness of Dorset's jointure. c. 45
Assurance of lands to Lady Dacres. c. 46

1542 (34 & 35 Hen. 8)

Public Acts

 (Religion) c. 1. An Act for the Advancement of true Religion, and for the Abolishment of the contrary.
 (Public Accountant) c. 2. An Act concerning Collectors and Receivers.
 (Assize of wood and coals) c. 3. An Act for the Assise of Coal and Wood.
 Statute of Bankrupts c. 4. An Act against such Persons as do make Bankrupt.
 (Wills) c. 5. An Act for the Explanation of the Statute of Wills.
 (Pins) c. 6. An Act for the true making of Pins.
 (Wines) c. 7. An Act to authorise certain of the King's Majesty's Council to set Prices upon Wines to be sold by Retail.
 Herbalists Act 1542 c. 8. An Act that Persons being no common Surgeons, may administer outward Medicines.
 (Unloading of ballast, etc. from ships) c. 9. An Act for the Preservation of the River of Severn.
 (Coverlets) c. 10. An Act for the true making of Coverlets in York.
 (Welsh frises and cottons) c. 11. An Act for the true making of Frises and Cottons in Wales.
 (London and Westminster paving) c. 12. An Act for the paving of certain Lanes and Streets in London and Westminster.
 Chester and Cheshire (Constituencies) Act 1542 c. 13. An Act for Knights and Burgesses to have Places in the Parliament for the County Palatine and City of Chester.
 (Criminal law) c. 14. An Act for the Certificate of Convicts to be made into the King's Bench.
 (Dean and Chapter of Wells) c. 15. An Act touching the Dean and Chapter of Wells, to be one sole Chapter of itself.
 (Sheriffs) c. 16. An Act for Sheriffs to be discharged upon their Accounts, and to have Allowances for their reasonable Expences in the Court of Exchequer.
 (Tenths payable by certain bishops) c. 17. An Act for the new-erected Bishops to pay their Tenths into the Court of the First-fruits.
 (Canterbury liberties) c. 18. An Act for Canterbury, concerning the Privileges of the fame.
 Religious Houses Act 1542 c. 19. An Act for the Payment of Pensions and Portions granted out of the late Abbies.
 Feigned Recoveries Act 1542 c. 20. An Act to embar feigned Recovery of Lands wherein the King's Majesty is in Reversion.
 (Confirmation of grants) c. 21. An Act for the Confirmation of Letters Patents; notwithstanding misnaming of any Thing contained in the same.
 (Fines of lands) c. 22. An Act that Fines in Towns Corporate shall be made as the same have been in Times past.
 (Proclamations) c. 23. An Act for the due Execution of Proclamations.
 (Sheriff of Cambridgeshire and payment of members) c. 24. An Act for the Assurance of certain Lands to John Hinde, Sergeant at Law.
 (Windmill, etc. at Poole) c. 25. An Act for the Edification of a Windmill, and a Conduit at the King's Majesty's Town of Poole.
 Laws in Wales Act 1542 c. 26 (repealed 1993 (c. 38) & 1994 (c. 32)). An Act for certain Ordinances in the King's Majesty's Dominion and Principality of Wales.
 (Taxation) c. 27. An Act for the Subsidy of the Temporalty.
 (Taxation) c. 28. An Act for the Subsidy of the Clergy granted of both Provinces, Canterbury and York.

Private Acts

Exchange of the Manor of Clerkenwell between King and Duke of Norfolk. c. 29
Assurance of the Treasureship of Sarum Cathedral to Thomas Robertson and of the Archdeaconry of Taunton to John Redman. c. 30
Denization of Thomas Brandoling's children. c. 31
Restitution in blood and name of Walter Hungerford and Edward Nevill. c. 32
Denization of William Maye's children. c. 33
Denization of Robert Dethick's children. c. 34
Assurance of the Clerkship of the Treasury and Warrants in the King's Bench to John Payne. c. 35
Grant of Parsonage of Strubby to Lincoln Cathedral. c. 36
Exchange between Archbishop of Canterbury, John Gage and Thomas Culpepper. c. 37
Assurance of Anne Sidney's jointure. c. 38
John Strelley's estate: partition amongst his daughters. c. 39
Elisabeth Burgh's children: deeming them illegitimate. c. 40
Assignment of Lady Cobham's jointure. c. 41
Hugh Dennis' inheritance and Magdalen College Cambridge's annuity. c. 42
Lady Parr's children: deeming them illegitimate. c. 43
Lady Draycot's estate: assurance of lands to certain heirs. c. 44
For the confirmation or establishment of Southwell Collegiate Church. c. 45
Sir Roger Lewkenor's inheritance: granting the lands according to the King's award. c. 46
Exchange between Bishop of Norwich and Thomas Paston. c. 47
Exchange between King and Bryan Tuke. c. 48

1543 (35 Hen. 8)

Public Acts

 (Succession to the Crown) c. 1. An Act concerning the establishment of the King's Majesty's Succession in the Imperial Crown of the Realm.
 Treason Act 1543 c. 2
 (King's style) c. 3
 (Repair of decayed houses, England and Wales) c. 4
 (Religion) c. 5
 (Jurors) c. 6
 (Fish) c. 7
 (Coopers) c. 8
 (Land reclamation (Wapping Marsh)) c. 9
 (London water supply) c. 10
 (Parliament) c. 11
 (Loans to the King) c. 12
 (Lands at Walsingham (copyhold)) c. 13
 (Lands of religious houses under £200 a year (tenure)) c. 14
 (Paving of streets, Cambridge) c. 15
 (Canon law) c. 16
 (Preservation of woods) c. 17
 (General pardon) c. 18

Private Acts

Exchange between King and William Bonham. c. 19
Ratification of Queen Katherine's jointure. c. 20
Exchange between the King and Mr Wollascott. c. 21
Exchange between the King and Duke of Norfolk and Earl of Surrey. c. 22
Exchange between the King and Denny. c. 23
Ratification of the King's award between Lord Dacre and the heirs of Sir James Strangways. c. 24
Assurance of the Prebend of East and West Bedwin [Wiltshire] to the Earl of Hertford. c. 25

1545 (37 Hen. 8)

Public Acts

 Custos Rotulorum Act 1545 c. 1
 (Hounslow Heath lands (copyhold, etc.)) c. 2
 (Huntington Lane, Cheshire (repairs)) c. 3
 Dissolution of Colleges Act 1545 c. 4
 (Attaints) c. 5
 (Criminal law) c. 6
 (Justice of the Peace) c. 7
 (Indictments) c. 8
 (Usury) c. 9
 (Libel) c. 10
 (Repair of marshes, East Greenwich) c. 11
 (Tithes in London) c. 12
 (Repeal of 34 & 35 Hen. 8. c. 6 (pin-making)) c. 13
 (Scarborough Pier) c. 14
 (Wool) c. 15
 (Duchy of Lancaster) c. 16
 (Ecclesiastical jurisdiction) c. 17
 (Crown lands (Honours of Westminster, Kingston, Saint Osyth's, and Donington)) c. 18
 (Fines of lands in Lancashire) c. 19
 Religious Houses Act 1545 c. 20
 (Benefices) c. 21
 (Juries) c. 22
 (Continuance of Acts) c. 23
 (Taxation) c. 24
 (Taxation) c. 25

Private Acts

Exchange between the Lord Chancellor, the Lord Great Chamberlain and the Bishop of Salisbury. c. 26
Francis Knolles' estate in the manor of Rotherfield Greys [Oxfordshire]. c. 27
Jasper Hartwell and others. c. 28
Assurance of the manor of Ashby-Puerorum [Lincolnshire] to Thomas Littlebury. c. 29
Legitimation of Sir Ralph Sadler's children. c. 30
Knights of St. John marriage enabling. c. 31
Assurance of the Countess of Arundel's jointure. c. 32

1546 (38 Hen. 8)

Private Acts

Attainder of Duke of Norfolk and Earl of Surrey c. 1

Edward VI (1547–1553)

1547 (1 Edw. 6)

Public Acts

 Sacrament Act 1547 c. 1. An Act against such as shall unreverently speak against the Sacrament of the body and blood of Christ commonly called the Sacrament of the Altar, and for the receiving thereof in both Kinds. (still in force)
 (Election of bishops) c. 2. An Act for the election of Bishops and what Seals and Style they and other Spiritual persons exercising Jurisdiction Ecclesiastical shall use.
 Vagabonds Act c. 3
 (Tenures) c. 4
 (Exportation) c. 5
 (Worsted yarn) c. 6
 Justices of the Peace Act 1547 c. 7
 (Confirmation of grants) c. 8
 (York (reduction of number of churches)) c. 9
 (Exigents, etc. in Wales and Cheshire) c. 10
 (Repeal of 28 Hen. 8. c. 17) c. 11. An Act for the repeal of a certain Statute made in the xxviiith Year of the Reign of the late King of most famous memory, Henry the Eighth, for revoking Acts of Parliament.
 (Repeal of statutes as to treasons, felonies, etc.) c. 12
 (Taxation) c. 13
 Dissolution of Colleges Act 1547 c. 14
 (General pardon) c. 15

Private Acts

Establishment of Wells Deanery. c. 1
Assurance of lands to Crown from Earl of Rutland. c. 2
Assurance of lands to Lord Riche and Sir William Shelley. c. 3
Restitution in blood of Lord Stafford. c. 4
Restitution in blood of John Lumley. c. 5
Restitution in blood of Griffith Rise. c. 6

1548 (2 & 3 Edw. 6)

Public Acts

 Act of Uniformity 1548 c. 1
 (Soldiers) c. 2
 (Purveyors) c. 3
 (Sheriffs) c. 4
 (Certain fee-farms) c. 5
 (Traffic with Iceland, etc.) c. 6
 (Religious houses) c. 7
 (Inquisitions of escheator) c. 8
 (Leather) c. 9
 (Malt) c. 10
 (Leather) c. 11
 (Assurance of lands of Duke of Somerset) c. 12
 (Easter offerings and tithes) c. 13
 (Hail-shot) c. 14
 (Victuallers, etc.) c. 15
 (Custody of castles, etc.) c. 16
 (Attainder of Sir William Sherington) c. 17
 (Attainder and death sentence of Lord Seymour, High Admiral) c. 18
 (Abstinence from flesh) c. 19
 (Payment of tenths to King) c. 20
 Clergy Marriage Act 1548 c. 21
 (Customs) c. 22
 (Marriages (pre-contract)) c. 23
 (Criminal law) c. 24
 (Sheriff's county court) c. 25
 (Exportation) c. 26
 (Gads of steel) c. 27
 (Fines of lands, Cheshire) c. 28
 (Sodomy) c. 29
 (Rye and Winchelsea) c. 30
 (Recognizances) c. 31
 (Perpetuation of Acts) c. 32
 (Horse stealing) c. 33
 (Sheriff of Northumberland) c. 34
 (Taxation) c. 35
 (Taxation) c. 36
 (Exportation) c. 37
 (Calais) c. 38
 (General pardon) c. 39

Private Acts

Kent Gavelkind lands. c. 1
Restitution in blood of Sir George Darcy. c. 2
Restitution in blood of Frances Carewe. c. 3
Restitution in blood of Edward Charleton. c. 4
Restitution in blood of Sir Ralph Bulmer. c. 5
Restitution in blood of Henry Weston. c. 6
Restitution in blood of Ralph Bygode. c. 7
Restitution in blood of Thomas Percy. c. 8
Union of churches in Lincoln. c. 9
Exeter City: enlargement of the boundary. c. 10
Uniting of churches in Stamford. c. 11
Bartholomew Burgoyn's abscondence overseas. c. 12
Assignment of lands to Lord Thomas Howard's sons. c. 13
Foundation of St. Alban's school by Richard Bourman. c. 14
Maintenance of the Isle of Anglesey Sessions and Court Days at Beaumaris. c. 15
Uniting of Ongar and Greenstead Churches (Essex). c. 16
Uniting of the churches of St. Clements and St. Nicholas, Rochester. c. 17
Assurance of lands to Earl of Bath, Margaret Long, Lord Fitzwarren and Frances Kitson. c. 18
Mayor of Newcastle and Edward Lawson. c. 19
Foundation of Berkhamstead School. c. 20
Confirmation of the foundation of Stamford School. c. 21

1549 (3 & 4 Edw. 6)

Public Acts

 (Custos rotulorum) c. 1
 (Woollen cloths) c. 2
 (Improvement of commons) c. 3
 (Crown lands) c. 4
 (Riot) c. 5
 (Leather) c. 6
 (Wild fowl) c. 7
 (Continuance of Statute of Sewers) c. 8
 (Buying of hides) c. 9
 (Putting away of books and images) c. 10
 (Canon law) c. 11
 (Consecration of bishops, etc.) c. 12
 (Restitution of Sir William Sherington) c. 13
 (Restitution of Mary Seymour) c. 14
 (Prophecies) c. 15
 (Vagabonds) c. 16
 (Unlawful hunting) c. 17
 (Certain fee-farm rents) c. 18
 (Buying cattle) c. 19
 (Victuallers, etc.) c. 20
 (Butter and cheese) c. 21
 (Journeymen) c. 22
 (Taxation) c. 23
 (General pardon) c. 24

Private Acts

Creation of a churchyard at West Drayton. c. 1
River Dee weirs (Chester). c. 2
Wells Church dividends and quotidians. c. 3
Disinheriting William West. c. 4
Restitution in blood of Thomas Isleye. c. 5
Restitution in blood of Sir William Hussey. c. 6
Duke of Somerset's fine and ransom. c. 7

1551 (5 & 6 Edw. 6)

Public Acts

 Act of Uniformity 1551 c. 1
 Poor Act 1552 c. 2
 Holy Days and Fasting Days Act 1551 c. 3
 Brawling Act 1551 c. 4
 (Tillage) c. 5
 (Woollen cloth) c. 6
 (Wool) c. 7
 (Woollen cloth) c. 8
 (Robbery) c. 9
 (Robbery) c. 10
 Treason Act 1551 c. 11
 Clergy Marriage Act 1551 c. 12
 (Monasteries, etc.) c. 13
 (Forestallers) c. 14
 (Regratours of tanned leather) c. 15
 Sale of Offices Act 1551 c. 16 (still in force)
 (Continuance of Acts) c. 17
 (Navigation) c. 18
 (Money) c. 19
 (Usury) c. 20
 (Pedlars) c. 21
 (Gig mills) c. 22
 (Stuffing of feather beds, etc.) c. 23
 (Making of hats, etc.) c. 24
 Ale Houses Act 1551 c. 25
 (Proclamations and exigents (Lancaster)) c. 26

Private Acts

Assurance of manor of Merevale (Warwickshire) and other lands to Sir William Devereux c. 1
Assurance of lands sold by the King to the City of London c. 2
Restitution of the heirs of Sir John Nevill c. 3
Marquis of Northampton's marriage c. 4
Restitution in blood of Sir John Fortescue c. 5
Assurance of Lady Abergavenny's jointure c. 6
Denization of wives and children of Edward Allen, John Rogers, John Madwell and James Bylney c. 7
Foundation of Pocklington Grammar School (Yorkshire) c. 8
Frustration of assurance of lands to Duke of Somerset by Earl of Oxford c. 9
Erection of the Cathedral Church of St. Peter of Westminster, and uniting it to the jurisdiction of the Bishop of London c. 10
Limitation of the late Edward, Duke of Somerset's estate c. 11

1553

7 Edw. 6

Public Acts

 (Crown revenues) c. 1
 (Dissolution of certain courts) c. 2
 (Crown lands) c. 3
 (Payment of tenths to King) c. 4
 (Wines) c. 5
 (Exportation) c. 6
 (Assize of fuel) c. 7
 (Fulling of caps) c. 8
 (Cloths) c. 9
 (Gateside united to Newcastle-upon-Tyne) c. 10
 (Continuance of Acts) c. 11
 (Taxation) c. 12
 (Taxation) c. 13
 (General pardon) c. 14

Private Acts

Bishopric of Durham dissolution and re-erection; erection of new bishopric at Newcastle. c. 1
Restitution in blood of Sir Edward Seymour. c. 2
Denization of children of Richard Hills and Nicholas Wheler. c. 3

Mary I (1553–1554)

1 Mar. Sess. 1 

Note that these Acts are also cited as "1 Mar. Stat. 1"

Public Acts 

 Treason Act 1553 c. 1

Private Acts 

Restitution in blood of Lady Gartrude Courtney. c. 1
Restitution in blood of Sir Edward Courtney, Earl of Devon. c. 2

1 Mar. Sess. 2 

Note that these Acts are also cited as "1 Mar. Stat. 2"

Public Acts 

 (Legitimacy of the Queen, etc.) c. 1. An Act declaring that the Regal Power of this Realm is in the Queen's Majesty as fully and absolutely as ever it was in any of her most noble Progenitors Kings of this Realm.
 (Repeal of Acts) c. 2
 Brawling Act 1553 c. 3
 (Validity of certain writings, etc.) c. 4
 (Limitation of actions) c. 5
 (Treason) c. 6
 (Fines of land) c. 7
 (Sheriff not to act as justice) c. 8
 (College of Physicians) c. 9
 (Dissolution of courts) c. 10
 (Hats and caps) c. 11
 (Riot) c. 12
 (Continuance of Acts) c. 13
 (Gaols) c. 14
 (York (rebuilding of Saint Helen's Stanegate)) c. 15
 Attainder of Duke of Northumberland and others Act 1553 c. 16
 (Taxation) c. 17
 (Taxation) c. 18

Private Acts 

Restitution in blood of Thomas Howard, Earl of Surrey. c. 1
Restitution in blood of Sir Edward Seymour. c. 2
Incorporation of Merton College, Oxford. c. 3
Restitution in blood of the heirs of Lord Montague. c. 4
Restitution in blood of Sir Marmaduke Constable. c. 5
Restitution in blood of Thomas Stanhope. c. 6
Restitution in blood of Mathew Arundel. c. 7
Keeping the county days in Cardiganshire. c. 8
Restitution in blood of the heirs of Sir Miles Partriche. c. 9
Denization of wives and children of Richard Batson, Thomas Browne, and John Bradleye. c. 10
Repair of Sherbourne Causeway. c. 11
Marquis of Northampton's marriage confirmation repeal. c. 12
Reversal of the supposed attainder of Thomas, Duke of Norfolk. c. 13

1554

1 Mar. Sess. 3

Note that these Acts are also cited as "1 Mar. Stat. 3"

Public Acts

 Queen Regent's Prerogative Act 1554 c. 1
 (Queen Mary's Marriage Act) c. 2
 (See of Durham) c. 3
 Lord Steward Act 1554 c. 4 (still in force)
 (Sherborne Causeway (repair)) c. 5
 (Highway, Bristol to Gloucester) c. 6
 (Cloth making) c. 7
 (Leather) c. 8
 (Cathedral, etc. churches) c. 9
 (Essex churches) c. 10
 (Sea Sands, Glamorganshire) c. 11
 (Continuance of Acts) c. 12

Private Acts

Restitution in blood of Sir William Parr, late Marquis of Northampton. c. 1
Restitution and assurance of manors of Gaywood and Rising (Norfolk) to Thomas Howard, Earl of Surrey. c. 2
Ratification of Dame Lucy Clifford's estate in the manor of Burston Hawgh. c. 3

Mary I and Philip (1554–1558)

1554 (1 & 2 Ph. & M.)

Public Acts

 (Signing of letters patent, etc.) c. 1
 (Apparel) c. 2
 (Seditious words) c. 3
 (Egyptians) c. 4
 (Exportation) c. 5
 (Heresy) c. 6
 (Towns corporate) c. 7
 (See of Rome) c. 8
 (Traitorous words) c. 9
 Treason Act 1554 c. 10
 (Counterfeit coin) c. 11
 Distress Act 1554 c. 12
 (Criminal law) c. 13
 (Worsteds, Norfolk) c. 14
 (Lords marches in Wales) c. 15
 (Continuance of certain Acts) c. 16
 (Leases) c. 17

Private Acts

Reversal of the attainder of Cardinal Pole. c. 1
Reversal of the outlawries and attainders of Richard Pate, Bishop William Peto and others. c. 2
Confirmation of attainders of Henry late Duke of Suffolk and others. c. 3
Annexation of Bucknell to Salop. c. 4

1555 (2 & 3 Ph. & M.)

Public Acts

 (Northern borders) c. 1
 (Tillage) c. 2
 (Increase of cattle) c. 3
 (First fruits, etc.) c. 4
 Poor Act c. 5
 (Purveyors) c. 6
 Sale of Horses Act 1555 c. 7
 Highways Act 1555 c. 8
 (Gaming) c. 9
 (Criminal law) c. 10
 (Weavers) c. 11
 (Cloths) c. 12
 (Buying of wool, Halifax) c. 13
 (Rebuilding of mills near Hereford) c. 14
 (Purveyors) c. 15
 (Thames watermen) c. 16
 (Commissioners of peace in boroughs) c. 18
 (Benet Smythe deprived of benefit of clergy) c. 17
 (Powdyke in Marshland (malicious injury a felony)) c. 19
 (Duchy of Lancaster) c. 20
 (Continuance of Acts) c. 21
 (Taxation) c. 22
 (Taxation) c. 23

Private Acts

Duke of Norfolk's estate: power to make sales and grants, despite his minority, under the guidance of the Lord Chancellor, the Earl of Arundel and the Bishop of Ely. c. 1
Restitution to the Barony of Abergavenny of Sir Edward Nevill's heirs. c. 2

1557 (4 & 5 Ph. & M.)

Public Acts

 (Crown lands) c. 1
 (Military service) c. 2
 (Military service) c. 3
 (Accessories in murder, etc.) c. 4
 (Woollen cloths) c. 5
 (Aliens) c. 6
 (Juries) c. 7
 (Abduction) c. 8
 (Continuance of Acts) c. 9
 (Taxation) c. 10
 (Taxation) c. 11

Private Acts

Assurance of Honour of Raleigh to the Queen by Lord Ryche. c. 1
Assurance of the Countess of Sussex's jointure. c. 2
Restitution in blood of Sir Ambrose Dudley and Sir Robert Dudley. c. 3
Foundation of Stokepoges Hospital [Buckinghamshire]. c. 4
Payment of tithes in Coventry. c. 5

Elizabeth I (1558–1603)

1558 (1 Eliz. 1)

Public Acts

 Act of Supremacy 1558 c. 1. An Act restoring to the Crown the ancient Jurisdiction over the State Ecclesiastical and Spiritual, and abolishing all Foreign Power repugnant to the same. (Section 8 still in force)
 Act of Uniformity 1558 c. 2
 (Queen's title to the Crown) c. 3
 (First fruits and tenths) c. 4. An Act for the Restitution of the First Fruits, and Tenths and Rents reserved Nomine Decime, and of Parsonages Impropriate, to the Imperial Crown of this Realm.
 (Treason) c. 5
 (Seditious words) c. 6
 (Exportation) c. 7
 (Leather) c. 8
 (Leather) c. 9
 (Exportation) c. 10
 (Customs) c. 11
 (Linen) c. 12
 (Navigation) c. 13
 (Woollen cloths) c. 14
 (Timber) c. 15
 (Riot) c. 16
 (Fisheries) c. 17
 (Continuance of Acts) c. 18
 (Alienation by bishops) c. 19
 (Taxation) c. 20
 (Taxation) c. 21
 (Regulation of royal foundations) c. 22
 (Restoration of dignity of Anne Boleyn) c. 23
 Religious Houses Act 1558 c. 24

Private Acts

Restitution in blood of Lord John Gray. c. 1
Restitution in blood of Sir James Croftes. c. 2
Restitution in blood of Sir Henry Gates. c. 3
Assurance of lands to Lords Wentworth, Ryche and Darcye. c. 4
Naturalization of Gersome Wrothe. c. 5
Thomas and George Brownes' estate: modification of gavelkind. c. 6
Restitution in blood of Robert Rudston. c. 7
Reversal of the attainder of Cardinal Pole. c. 8
Incorporation of Trinity Hall, Cambridge. c. 9
Duke of Norfolk's marriage ratification and assurance of the Duchess's jointure. c. 10
Restitution in blood of Edward Lewkenor's children. c. 11
Revival of King's Lynn Fair. c. 12
Conwil Elvet chapel to be parish church of Abernant (Carmarthenshire). c. 13
Assurances of lands of Bishop of Winchester to Earl of Pembroke, Sir Philip Hobby, Sir John Mason and others. c. 14
Staffordshire Assizes and Sessions: maintenance at Stafford. c. 15
Restitution in blood of Lord Dacres. c. 16
Restitution in blood of Henry Howard, Jane Howard and *Katherine wife of Lord Berkeley. c. 17

1562 (5 Eliz. 1)

Public Acts

 (Supremacy of the Crown) c. 1
 (Tillage) c. 2
 Act for the Relief of the Poor c. 3
 Artificers and apprentices c. 4
 (Maintenance of the Navy) c. 5
 (Foreign stuffs) c. 6
 Importation Act 1562 c. 7
 (Leather) c. 8
 (Perjury) c. 9
 (Embezzlement) c. 10
 (Clipping coin) c. 11
 The Act touching Badgers of Corn and Drovers of Cattle, to be licensed c. 12
 Highways Act 1562 c. 13
 (Forgery) c. 14
 (False prophecies) c. 15
 Witchcraft Act 1562 c. 16
 (Sodomy) c. 17
 Lord Keeper Act 1562 c. 18
 (Exportation) c. 19
 (Egyptians) c. 20
 (Unlawful fishing, etc.) c. 21
 (Exportation) c. 22
 Writ De Excommunicato Capiendo Act 1562 c. 23
 (Gaols) c. 24
 (Juries) c. 25
 (Enrolment of indentures of bargain and sale) c. 26
 (Fines of land) c. 27
 (Translation of Bible, etc. into Welsh) c. 28
 (Taxation) c. 29
 (General pardon) c. 30
 (Taxation) c. 31
 (Expenses of the Queen's household) c. 32

Private Acts

City of Exeter: confirmation of liberties granted by letters patent. c. 1
Southampton: confirmation of letters patent concerning importation of wines. c. 2
Viscount Byndon's estate: power to grant leases for 21 years or three lives. c. 3
Authorising Lord Abergavenny to grant leases for 21 years. c. 4
Henry Howarde's estate: restraining him from discontinuing his lands. c. 5
Annuity for founding a school at Guildford. c. 6
Plumstead Marsh (Kent) inclosure and drainage. c. 7
Restitution in blood of Lord Husseye's children. c. 8
Restitution in blood of William West. c. 9
Restitution in blood of Sir Peter Carewe. c. 10
Restitution in blood of Sir Ralph Chamberlaine and John Harleston. c. 11
Restitution in blood of Brooke or Cobham, Cromer, Vaughan and others. c. 12
Restitution in blood of Thomas Isley's heirs. c. 13
Restitution in blood of Anne Thomas, daughter and heir of William Thomas. c. 14
Restitution in blood of Thomas and James Diggs. c. 15
Restitution in blood of Thomas Cranmer's heirs. c. 16
Restitution in blood of William and Edward Isleye. c. 17
Restitution in blood of Edward Turner. c. 18
Denization of children of John Fitzwilliams, James Harvye and others. c. 19

1566 (8 Eliz. 1)

Public Acts

 (Bishops) c. 1
 (Defendant's recovery of costs) c. 2
 (Exportation) c. 3
 (Benefit of clergy) c. 4
 (Judgment of delegates) c. 5
 (Exportation) c. 6
 (Drapers, etc., Shrewsbury) c. 7
 (Horses) c. 8
 (Prices of barrels, etc.) c. 9
 (Bows) c. 10
 (Hats and caps) c. 11
 (Cloths, Lancashire) c. 12
 (Sea marks) c. 13
 (Leather) c. 14
 (Preservation of grain) c. 15
 (Sheriffs) c. 16
 (Taxation) c. 17
 (Taxation) c. 18
 (General pardon) c. 19
 (Criminal law) c. 20

Private Acts

Merchant Adventurers' incorporation. c. 1
St. Bartholomew's Hospital, Gloucester: confirmation of letters patent. c. 2
Bristol Merchant Adventurers: confirmation of letters patent. c. 3
Plumstead Marsh (Kent) inclosure and drainage. c. 4
Assurance of the Countess of Warwick's jointure. c. 5
Assurance of Lady Cobham's jointure. c. 6
Assurance of Lady Stafford's jointure. c. 7
Denization of John Stafford. c. 8
Thomas Browne's estate: modification of gavelkind. c. 9
York Town Clerk. c. 10
Paving of Kentish Street, Southwark. c. 11
Battle (Sussex): maintenance of a market on Thursdays. c. 12

1570 (13 Eliz. 1)

Public Acts

 Treason Act 1571 c. 1
 Bulls, etc., from Rome Act 1571 c. 2
 (Fugitives) c. 3
 (Lands of Crown accountants liable for their debts) c. 4
 Fraudulent Conveyances Act 1571 c. 5
 Letters Patent Act 1571 c. 6 (still in force)
 (Bankrupts) c. 7
 (Usury) c. 8
 (Commission of Sewers) c. 9
 Ecclesiastical Leases Act 1571 c. 10
 (Navigation) c. 11
 Ordination of Ministers Act 1571 c. 12
 (Tillage) c. 13
 (Importation) c. 14
 (Hoys) c. 15
 Attainders of Earl of Westmorland and others Act 1571 c. 16
 (Earl of Leicester's Hospital) c. 17
 (River Lee (new cut)) c. 18
 (Caps) c. 19
 (Benefices) c. 20
 (Purveyance) c. 21
 (Sheriffs) c. 22
 (London streets) c. 23
 Ipswich Improvement Act 1571 c. 24
 (Continuance of Acts) c. 25
 (Taxation) c. 26
 (Taxation) c. 27
 (General pardon) c. 28
 Oxford and Cambridge Act 1571 c. 29 (still in force)

Private Acts

Making the River Welland navigable. c. 1
Denization of Peregrine Bertie. c. 2
Southampton importation of wines. c. 3
Corporation of Merchant Adventurers in Bristol: repeal. c. 4
Lostwithiel (Cornwall): validating all statutes and recognizances acknowledged before the mayor. c. 5
Assurance of lands to William Skeffington. c. 6
Morice Rodney. c. 7
Restitution in blood of Sir Thomas Wyat's children. c. 8
Incorporation and uniting of Weymouth and Melcombe Regis. c. 9
Restitution in blood of Henry Brereton. c. 10
Assurance of lands to Lord Berkeley. c. 11
John Tyrrell. c. 12

1572 (14 Eliz. 1)

Public Acts

 Rebellion Act 1572 c. 1
 Escape of Traitors Act 1572 c. 2
 (Coin) c. 3
 (Exportation) c. 4
 Vagabonds Act c. 5
 (Fugitives) c. 6
 (Tenths) c. 7
 (Recoveries) c. 8
 (Juries) c. 9
 (Kerseys) c. 10
 Ecclesiastical Leases Act 1572 c. 11
 (Partial repeal of 8 Eliz. c. 7) c. 12
 (Hexhamshire) c. 13
 Hospitals for the Poor Act 1572 c. 14

Private Acts

Plumstead Marsh (Kent) inclosure and drainage continuance. c. 1
Assurance of lands for Tonbridge Grammar School. c. 2
Assurance of lands to certain infants by Sir Thomas and Sir William Woodhouse. c. 3

1575 (18 Eliz. 1)

Public Acts

 (Coin) c. 1
 (Crown lands) c. 2
 Poor Act 1575 c. 3
 (Fraudulent conveyances by late rebels in the North) c. 4
 Common Informers Act 1575 c. 5
 (Universities and colleges, (leases, etc.)) c. 6
 Benefit of Clergy Act 1575 c. 7
 (Welsh circuits) c. 8
 (Exportation) c. 9
 (Highways) c. 10
 Ecclesiastical Leases Act 1575 c. 11
 (Nisi prius, Middlesex) c. 12
 (Knight service) c. 13
 (Jeofails) c. 14
 (Marking plate) c. 15
 (Clothiers) c. 16
 Rochester Bridge Act 1575 c. 17
 (Chepstow Bridge) c. 18
 (Paving of streets, Chichester) c. 19
 (Oxford, road repairs) c. 20
 (Licence for wool sale at New Woodstock) c. 21
 (Taxation) c. 22
 (Taxation) c. 23
 (General pardon) c. 24

Private Acts

Leicester hospital. c. 1
St. Cross Hospital, Winchester. c. 2
Parish of Halifax tithes. c. 3
Assurance of Manor of New Hall to Thomas Earl of Sussex. c. 4
Viscount Howard of Byndon, and Henry and Frances Howard. c. 5
Restitution in blood of Lord Norris of Rycote. c. 6
Naturalization of Lady Gray. c. 7
Assurance of lands to Christopher Hatton. c. 8
Payment of William Iseleye's debts. c. 9
Assurance of lands to Sir John Ryvers. c. 10
Naturalization of twelve citizens of Antwerp. c. 11
Naturalization of certain persons. c. 12
Richard Huddleston, Isabel Weyneman his wife and Francis Weyneman: confirmation of an arbitration. c. 13

1580 (23 Eliz. 1)

Public Acts

 Religion Act 1580 c. 1
 (Seditious words) c. 2
 (Fines and recoveries) c. 3
 (Border defences) c. 4
 (Preservation of wood) c. 5
 (Dover Haven tolls, etc.) c. 6
 (Navigation) c. 7
 (Wax) c. 8
 (Dyeing of cloth) c. 9
 (Game) c. 10
 (Cardiff Bridge) c. 11
 (Paving streets in London) c. 12
 (Land reclamation (Plumstead Marsh)) c. 13
 (Taxation) c. 14
 (Taxation) c. 15
 (General pardon) c. 16

Private Acts

Cringleford (Norwich) rebuilding. c. 1
Naturalization of Coppinger, Boureman, Watson, Holmes, Harman, Hughes and others. c. 2
Assurance of lands for Coventry Grammar School. c. 3
Sir Thomas Gresham's estate: confirmation of an agreement between Sir Henry Nevill and Dame Anne Gresham for the better performance of his will and payment of his debts. c. 4
Assurance of a rent of £82 10s. to the Bishop of Coventry and Lichfield. c. 5
Restitution in blood of Philip, Earl of Arundel. c. 6
Pardon and restitution in blood of John and Dudley St. Leger. c. 7
Restitution in blood of Anthony Mayney. c. 8
Assurance of lands to Lord Compton. c. 9
Ratification of Chancery award concerning copyholders and customary tenants of the manors of Moore, Newham, Lyndriche, Knighton and Pensokes (Worcestershire). c. 10
Ratification of award between William Hide and William Darrell. c. 11
Ledbury Hospital (Herefordshire). c. 12
Partition of lands between the coheirs of Lord Latymer. c. 13

1584  (27 Eliz. 1)

Public Acts

 Safety of the Queen, etc. Act 1584 c. 1
 Jesuits, etc. Act 1584 c. 2
 (Lands of Crown accountants) c. 3
 (Fraudulent conveyances) c. 4
 (Demurrers and pleadings) c. 5
 (Juries) c. 6
 (Juries) c. 7
 (Error from Queen's Bench) c. 8
 (Fines and recoveries) c. 9
 (Common informers) c. 10
 (Continuance, etc. of Acts) c. 11
 (Swearing of under-sheriffs) c. 12
 (Hue and cry) c. 13
 (Malt) c. 14
 (Importation) c. 15
 (Leather) c. 16
 (Cloths) c. 17
 (Cloths) c. 18
 (Preservation of timber) c. 19
 (Plymouth Haven) c. 20
 (Fishing, Orford Haven, Suffolk) c. 21
 (Chichester Haven (access to City)) c. 22
 (Clothiers) c. 23
 (Norfolk coast (defence against sea encroachment; statute labour)) c. 24
 (Rochester Bridge) c. 25
 (Isle of Sheppey (roads)) c. 26
 (Land reclamation (Plumstead Marsh)) c. 27
 (Taxation) c. 28
 (Taxation) c. 29
 (General pardon) c. 30
 (Westminster) c. 31

Private Acts

Maintenance of Lyme Regis Pier or Cob. c. 1
Queen's College, Oxford: confirmation of letters patent. c. 2
Clare Hall, Cambridge: confirmation of letters patent. c. 3
Assurances by Bishop and Dean and Chapter of Exeter. c. 4
Government of the City of Westminster. c. 5
Establishment of Countess of Huntingdon's jointure. c. 6
Assurance of lands to Sir Thomas Lucie and others. c. 7
Assurance of lands in Norfolk, Suffolk, Lincoln and Warwick to Lord Willoughby and Erisbie against the heirs and assigns of Walter Herenden. c. 8
Assurance of lands to Lord Hunsdon. c. 9
Lands of Lord Dacres and Lord Norris. c. 10
Lord Thomas Howard's restitution in blood. c. 11
Assurance of lands to George Chewne, Giles Fluyd, and Christopher Puckering. c. 12
Establishment of award between Robert, Lord Rich and Sir Thomas Barrington. c. 13
Assurance of property in the City of London to Jonas Scott. c. 14
Payment of Edward Fisher's debts. c. 15
Incorporation of Christ's Hospital, Sherburn (Durham). c. 16
Better foundation and relief of the poor of Eastbridge Hospital, Canterbury. c. 17
New Windsor (Berkshire) paving. c. 18
Newark-upon-Trent (Nottinghamshire) paving. c. 19

1586 (29 Eliz. 1)

Note that this session is also cited as "28 & 29 Eliz. 1"

Public Acts

 (Attainder of Lord Paget and others) c. 1. An Act for the Confirmation of the Attainder of Thomas late Lord Paget and others.
 Treason Act 1586 c. 2
 (Assurances by certain traitors) c. 3
 (Sheriff's poundage, etc.) c. 4
 (Continuance, etc. of Acts) c. 5
 (Religion) c. 6
 (Taxation) c. 7
 (Taxation) c. 8
 (General pardon) c. 9

Private Acts

 Confirmation of sale of Edward Fisher's lands. c. 1

1588 (31 Eliz. 1)

Public Acts

 (Error) c. 1
 (Fines of land) c. 2
 (Avoidance of secret outlawries) c. 3
 (Embezzlement) c. 4
 Common Informers Act 1588 c. 5
 Simony Act 1588 c. 6 (still in force)
 (Erection of Cottages Act 1588) c. 7
 (Sale of beer) c. 8
 (Proclamations and exigents (Durham)) c. 9
 (Continuance, etc. of Acts) c. 10
 Forcible Entry Act 1588 c. 11
 Sale of Horses Act 1588 c. 12
 (Dover Haven) c. 13
 (Taxation) c. 14
 (Taxation) c. 15
 (General pardon) c. 16

Private Acts

Preservation of Orford (Suffolk) harbour. c. 1
Naturalization of Joyce Lambert. c. 2
Assurance of Anne Nevell's jointure. c. 3
Lambourn Almshouse (Berkshire). c. 4
Relief of the City of Lincoln. c. 5
Thomas Handford's estate: sale of land for payment of debts to the King. c. 6
Thomas Hesilrigge's estate: avoidance of conveyances purported to have been made by Thomas Drury. c. 7
Assurance of lands for the maintenance of Tonbridge Grammar School. c. 8

1589 (31 Eliz. 10-11)

Public Acts

Private Acts 

 Letters Patent to John Spilman for the Exclusive Making of White Writing Paper, c. 22

1592-1593 (35 Eliz. 1)

Public Acts

 Religion Act 1592 c. 1 (a.k.a. Seditious Sectaries Act, a.k.a. Act Against Puritans)
 Popish Recusants Act 1592 c. 2
 (Explanation of 34 & 35 Hen. 8 c. 21) c. 3
 (Disabled soldiers) c. 4
 (Lands of Sir Francis Englefield (Englefield attainder)) c. 5
 (Restriction on building) c. 6
 (Continunace of Acts) c. 7
 (Cordage) c. 8
 (Cloths) c. 9
 (Cloth) c. 10
 (Clapboard) c. 11
 (Taxation) c. 12
 (Taxation) c. 13
 (General pardon) c. 14

Private Acts

City of Lincoln: confirmation of letters patent. c. 1
Sale or demise of the site of the dissolved House of Grey Friars, Cambridge, for the erection of a new college. c. 2
Better assurance and confirmation of the Countess of Cumberland's jointure. c. 3
Henry, late Lord Abergavenny's Estates. c. 4
Lord Hawarden's estate: sale of lands for payment of debts. c. 5
Restitution in blood of Sir Thomas Perrott. c. 6
Naturalization of William Sydney and Peregrine Wynckfield. c. 7
Confirmation of sale of Knightleys' estate. c. 8
Assurance of lands to Reade and Mabel Stafford. c. 9
Stonehouse water supply. c. 10
William Raven's estate: confirmation of sale of land to Lisle Cave, Thomas Andrews and Edward Haselrig for payment of a debt due to the King. c. 11
Anthony Cooke of Romford's estate: concerning the power to repeal the trusts of a deed. c. 12
Naturalization of certain Englishmen's children born overseas. c. 13

1597 (39 Eliz. 1)

Public Acts

 Houses of Husbandry Act 1597 c. 1
 Tillage Act 1597 c. 2
 (Poor) c. 3
 Vagabonds Act 1597 c. 4
 Hospitals for the Poor Act 1597 c. 5
 (Charitable trusts) c. 6
 (Crown debts) c. 7
 (Bishops) c. 8
 (Abduction) c. 9
 (Navigation) c. 10
 (Dyeing of cloth) c. 11
 (Labourers) c. 12
 (Fustians) c. 13
 (Importation) c. 14
 (Robbery) c. 15
 (Malt) c. 16
 (Vagabonds) c. 17
 (Continuance, etc. of Acts) c. 18
 (Highways) c. 19
 (Cloth) c. 20
 (Disabled soldiers) c. 21
 (See of Norwich) c. 22
 Newport and Caerleon Bridges over Usk Act 1597 c. 23
 (Bridge over Wye near Ross (Herefordshire)) c. 24
 (Hundred of Benhurst (Buckinghamshire), hue and cry) c. 25
 (Taxation) c. 26
 (Taxation) c. 27
 (General pardon) c. 28

Private Acts

Lease from Her Majesty to William Kirkham the younger. c. 1
Lord Mountjoy's estate: enabling him to dispose of entailed lands notwithstanding a private Act of 1535 (27 Hen. 8). c. 2
Establishment of Queen Elizabeth's Hospital, Bristol. c. 3
Establishment of the College of the Poor at Cobham (Kent). c. 4
Confirmation and assurance of lands for Earl of Leicester's Hospital, Warwick. c. 5
Naturalization of Baskervile, Lewkenor, Hill, Heather, Bemys and Sheppey. c. 6
Confirmation of Lady Sandys' jointure. c. 7
Wantage (Berkshire): establishment of the town lands for poor relief, highway repairs and the maintenance of a schoolmaster. c. 8
Arthur Hatche's rental of South Molton (Devon) rectory and parsonage. c. 9
Confirmation of Lady Varney's jointure. c. 10
Maintenance of Staines Bridge and Egham Causey. c. 11
Establishing land for the repair of Aylesbury (Buckinghamshire) roads, according to the will of John Bedford. c. 12
Sevenoaks School. c. 13
Establishing Sir Henry Unton's possessions and payment of debts. c. 14
William Pope's estate: enabling sale of land for payment of debts, and establishing a jointure to Lady Wentworth, his wife. c. 15

1601 (43 Eliz. 1)

Public Acts

 (Confirmation of certain grants) c. 1
 Poor Relief Act 1601 c. 2
 (Disabled soldiers) c. 3
 Charitable Uses Act 1601 c. 4
 (Inferior court) c. 5
 (Frivolous suits) c. 6
 (Robbing of orchards, etc.) c. 7
 (Fraudulent administration of intestates' goods) c. 8
 (Continuance of Acts, etc.) c. 9
 (Woollen cloth) c. 10
 (Land drainage in various counties) c. 11
 (Policies of assurance) c. 12
 (Outrages in northern counties) c. 13
 (Assise of fuel) c. 14
 (Fines of land) c. 15
 (Repair of Eden bridges, Cumberland) c. 16
 (Taxation) c. 17
 (Taxation) c. 18
 (General pardon) c. 19

Private Acts

Perfecting the Countess of Sussex's jointure. c. 1
Assurance of manors and lands for the Countess of Bedford's jointure. c. 2
Denization of Myllet, Pope, Chaundeler, Eaton and Tooley. c. 3
Edward Nevill and Sir Henry Nevill: disposal of copyhold lands held of the manors of Rotherfield (Sussex) and Alesley and Fylongley (Warwickshire). c. 4
Assurance of the manors or farms of Sageburie (otherwise Sadgebutie, Gageburie or Gadgeburie) and Obden to Samuel Sandis and John Harris. c. 5
Augmentation of Rachel Nevill's jointure. c. 6
Naturalization of Lupo and others. c. 7
Assurance of the Patronage of Rotherston (Cheshire) vicarage and a Scholar's room in Christchurch Cathedral, Oxford, by the Dean and Chapter to Thomas Venables. c. 8
Appeasing differences between Francis Ketelby and Andrew Ketelby and his wife Jane. c. 9
Edward Lucas' estate: making his lands liable for the payment of certain legacies and debts. c. 10

See also
List of Acts of the Parliament of England

References

External links

The Statutes of the Realm
The UK Statute Law Database
Chronological Tables of Local Acts and of Private and Personal Acts

The Statutes at Large
- Volume 4 - 1 Richard III to 31 Henry VIII - 1483-4 to 1539 - also - also
- Volume 5 - 32 Henry VIII to 7 Edward VI - 1540 to 1552-3
- Volume 6 - 1 Mary to 35 Elizabeth - 1554 to 1592-3 - also
- Volume 7 - 39 Elizabeth to 12 Charles II - 1597-8 to 1660

15th century in England
16th century in England
1485
Tudor England